

340001–340100 

|-bgcolor=#fefefe
| 340001 ||  || — || October 26, 2005 || Kitt Peak || Spacewatch || NYS || align=right data-sort-value="0.75" | 750 m || 
|-id=002 bgcolor=#fefefe
| 340002 ||  || — || October 26, 2005 || Kitt Peak || Spacewatch || V || align=right data-sort-value="0.76" | 760 m || 
|-id=003 bgcolor=#fefefe
| 340003 ||  || — || October 27, 2005 || Kitt Peak || Spacewatch || FLO || align=right data-sort-value="0.80" | 800 m || 
|-id=004 bgcolor=#fefefe
| 340004 ||  || — || October 27, 2005 || Mount Lemmon || Mount Lemmon Survey || — || align=right data-sort-value="0.99" | 990 m || 
|-id=005 bgcolor=#fefefe
| 340005 ||  || — || October 29, 2005 || Catalina || CSS || — || align=right | 1.0 km || 
|-id=006 bgcolor=#fefefe
| 340006 ||  || — || October 29, 2005 || Mount Lemmon || Mount Lemmon Survey || — || align=right data-sort-value="0.77" | 770 m || 
|-id=007 bgcolor=#fefefe
| 340007 ||  || — || October 29, 2005 || Mount Lemmon || Mount Lemmon Survey || — || align=right data-sort-value="0.83" | 830 m || 
|-id=008 bgcolor=#fefefe
| 340008 ||  || — || October 29, 2005 || Catalina || CSS || — || align=right | 1.2 km || 
|-id=009 bgcolor=#fefefe
| 340009 ||  || — || October 28, 2005 || Catalina || CSS || — || align=right data-sort-value="0.89" | 890 m || 
|-id=010 bgcolor=#d6d6d6
| 340010 ||  || — || October 27, 2005 || Kitt Peak || Spacewatch || SHU3:2 || align=right | 7.0 km || 
|-id=011 bgcolor=#fefefe
| 340011 ||  || — || October 29, 2005 || Mount Lemmon || Mount Lemmon Survey || FLO || align=right data-sort-value="0.75" | 750 m || 
|-id=012 bgcolor=#fefefe
| 340012 ||  || — || October 30, 2005 || Kitt Peak || Spacewatch || V || align=right data-sort-value="0.64" | 640 m || 
|-id=013 bgcolor=#fefefe
| 340013 ||  || — || October 31, 2005 || Kitt Peak || Spacewatch || — || align=right | 1.1 km || 
|-id=014 bgcolor=#FA8072
| 340014 ||  || — || October 29, 2005 || Kitt Peak || Spacewatch || — || align=right data-sort-value="0.94" | 940 m || 
|-id=015 bgcolor=#fefefe
| 340015 ||  || — || October 29, 2005 || Kitt Peak || Spacewatch || V || align=right data-sort-value="0.78" | 780 m || 
|-id=016 bgcolor=#fefefe
| 340016 ||  || — || October 29, 2005 || Catalina || CSS || — || align=right | 1.5 km || 
|-id=017 bgcolor=#fefefe
| 340017 ||  || — || October 29, 2005 || Catalina || CSS || — || align=right | 2.3 km || 
|-id=018 bgcolor=#fefefe
| 340018 ||  || — || October 29, 2005 || Catalina || CSS || PHO || align=right | 1.8 km || 
|-id=019 bgcolor=#fefefe
| 340019 ||  || — || October 27, 2005 || Kitt Peak || Spacewatch || — || align=right | 1.2 km || 
|-id=020 bgcolor=#fefefe
| 340020 ||  || — || October 27, 2005 || Kitt Peak || Spacewatch || MAS || align=right data-sort-value="0.76" | 760 m || 
|-id=021 bgcolor=#fefefe
| 340021 ||  || — || October 27, 2005 || Mount Lemmon || Mount Lemmon Survey || V || align=right data-sort-value="0.78" | 780 m || 
|-id=022 bgcolor=#fefefe
| 340022 ||  || — || October 27, 2005 || Kitt Peak || Spacewatch || — || align=right | 1.2 km || 
|-id=023 bgcolor=#fefefe
| 340023 ||  || — || October 27, 2005 || Kitt Peak || Spacewatch || — || align=right | 1.1 km || 
|-id=024 bgcolor=#fefefe
| 340024 ||  || — || October 30, 2005 || Mount Lemmon || Mount Lemmon Survey || — || align=right | 1.1 km || 
|-id=025 bgcolor=#fefefe
| 340025 ||  || — || October 28, 2005 || Catalina || CSS || ERI || align=right | 2.1 km || 
|-id=026 bgcolor=#fefefe
| 340026 ||  || — || October 29, 2005 || Mount Lemmon || Mount Lemmon Survey || MAS || align=right data-sort-value="0.72" | 720 m || 
|-id=027 bgcolor=#fefefe
| 340027 ||  || — || October 31, 2005 || Mount Lemmon || Mount Lemmon Survey || — || align=right data-sort-value="0.90" | 900 m || 
|-id=028 bgcolor=#d6d6d6
| 340028 ||  || — || October 31, 2005 || Mount Lemmon || Mount Lemmon Survey || 3:2 || align=right | 3.8 km || 
|-id=029 bgcolor=#fefefe
| 340029 ||  || — || October 28, 2005 || Kitt Peak || Spacewatch || — || align=right data-sort-value="0.87" | 870 m || 
|-id=030 bgcolor=#fefefe
| 340030 ||  || — || October 29, 2005 || Mount Lemmon || Mount Lemmon Survey || FLO || align=right data-sort-value="0.62" | 620 m || 
|-id=031 bgcolor=#fefefe
| 340031 ||  || — || October 26, 2005 || Kitt Peak || Spacewatch || NYS || align=right data-sort-value="0.81" | 810 m || 
|-id=032 bgcolor=#fefefe
| 340032 ||  || — || October 29, 2005 || Catalina || CSS || V || align=right data-sort-value="0.69" | 690 m || 
|-id=033 bgcolor=#fefefe
| 340033 ||  || — || October 30, 2005 || Kitt Peak || Spacewatch || NYS || align=right data-sort-value="0.77" | 770 m || 
|-id=034 bgcolor=#fefefe
| 340034 ||  || — || October 27, 2005 || Anderson Mesa || LONEOS || — || align=right data-sort-value="0.97" | 970 m || 
|-id=035 bgcolor=#fefefe
| 340035 ||  || — || October 27, 2005 || Mount Lemmon || Mount Lemmon Survey || V || align=right data-sort-value="0.70" | 700 m || 
|-id=036 bgcolor=#fefefe
| 340036 ||  || — || October 28, 2005 || Mount Lemmon || Mount Lemmon Survey || — || align=right | 1.1 km || 
|-id=037 bgcolor=#d6d6d6
| 340037 ||  || — || October 25, 2005 || Kitt Peak || Spacewatch || 3:2 || align=right | 4.7 km || 
|-id=038 bgcolor=#fefefe
| 340038 ||  || — || October 27, 2005 || Kitt Peak || Spacewatch || NYS || align=right data-sort-value="0.57" | 570 m || 
|-id=039 bgcolor=#fefefe
| 340039 ||  || — || October 22, 2005 || Palomar || NEAT || V || align=right data-sort-value="0.72" | 720 m || 
|-id=040 bgcolor=#fefefe
| 340040 ||  || — || October 22, 2005 || Catalina || CSS || — || align=right | 1.2 km || 
|-id=041 bgcolor=#fefefe
| 340041 ||  || — || October 23, 2005 || Catalina || CSS || V || align=right data-sort-value="0.70" | 700 m || 
|-id=042 bgcolor=#fefefe
| 340042 ||  || — || September 25, 2005 || Kitt Peak || Spacewatch || NYS || align=right data-sort-value="0.72" | 720 m || 
|-id=043 bgcolor=#fefefe
| 340043 ||  || — || October 25, 2005 || Kitt Peak || Spacewatch || V || align=right data-sort-value="0.82" | 820 m || 
|-id=044 bgcolor=#fefefe
| 340044 ||  || — || October 27, 2005 || Mount Lemmon || Mount Lemmon Survey || NYS || align=right data-sort-value="0.79" | 790 m || 
|-id=045 bgcolor=#fefefe
| 340045 ||  || — || October 28, 2005 || Kitt Peak || Spacewatch || — || align=right data-sort-value="0.73" | 730 m || 
|-id=046 bgcolor=#fefefe
| 340046 ||  || — || October 27, 2005 || Mount Lemmon || Mount Lemmon Survey || V || align=right data-sort-value="0.91" | 910 m || 
|-id=047 bgcolor=#fefefe
| 340047 ||  || — || October 25, 2005 || Catalina || CSS || MAS || align=right data-sort-value="0.78" | 780 m || 
|-id=048 bgcolor=#FFC2E0
| 340048 ||  || — || November 10, 2005 || Catalina || CSS || AMO || align=right data-sort-value="0.54" | 540 m || 
|-id=049 bgcolor=#fefefe
| 340049 ||  || — || November 1, 2005 || Socorro || LINEAR || NYS || align=right data-sort-value="0.79" | 790 m || 
|-id=050 bgcolor=#fefefe
| 340050 ||  || — || November 3, 2005 || Socorro || LINEAR || — || align=right | 1.2 km || 
|-id=051 bgcolor=#fefefe
| 340051 ||  || — || November 1, 2005 || Kitt Peak || Spacewatch || NYS || align=right data-sort-value="0.70" | 700 m || 
|-id=052 bgcolor=#fefefe
| 340052 ||  || — || October 25, 2005 || Kitt Peak || Spacewatch || — || align=right | 1.1 km || 
|-id=053 bgcolor=#fefefe
| 340053 ||  || — || November 1, 2005 || Kitt Peak || Spacewatch || V || align=right data-sort-value="0.70" | 700 m || 
|-id=054 bgcolor=#fefefe
| 340054 ||  || — || November 1, 2005 || Kitt Peak || Spacewatch || V || align=right data-sort-value="0.57" | 570 m || 
|-id=055 bgcolor=#fefefe
| 340055 ||  || — || November 4, 2005 || Kitt Peak || Spacewatch || NYS || align=right data-sort-value="0.76" | 760 m || 
|-id=056 bgcolor=#fefefe
| 340056 ||  || — || November 4, 2005 || Kitt Peak || Spacewatch || — || align=right data-sort-value="0.89" | 890 m || 
|-id=057 bgcolor=#fefefe
| 340057 ||  || — || November 4, 2005 || Kitt Peak || Spacewatch || NYS || align=right data-sort-value="0.65" | 650 m || 
|-id=058 bgcolor=#fefefe
| 340058 ||  || — || November 4, 2005 || Kitt Peak || Spacewatch || ERI || align=right | 1.8 km || 
|-id=059 bgcolor=#fefefe
| 340059 ||  || — || November 2, 2005 || Mount Lemmon || Mount Lemmon Survey || V || align=right data-sort-value="0.82" | 820 m || 
|-id=060 bgcolor=#fefefe
| 340060 ||  || — || November 4, 2005 || Catalina || CSS || V || align=right data-sort-value="0.70" | 700 m || 
|-id=061 bgcolor=#fefefe
| 340061 ||  || — || November 4, 2005 || Mount Lemmon || Mount Lemmon Survey || — || align=right data-sort-value="0.75" | 750 m || 
|-id=062 bgcolor=#fefefe
| 340062 ||  || — || November 3, 2005 || Socorro || LINEAR || — || align=right data-sort-value="0.88" | 880 m || 
|-id=063 bgcolor=#fefefe
| 340063 ||  || — || November 5, 2005 || Kitt Peak || Spacewatch || NYS || align=right data-sort-value="0.71" | 710 m || 
|-id=064 bgcolor=#fefefe
| 340064 ||  || — || November 3, 2005 || Catalina || CSS || — || align=right data-sort-value="0.78" | 780 m || 
|-id=065 bgcolor=#fefefe
| 340065 ||  || — || November 4, 2005 || Kitt Peak || Spacewatch || — || align=right data-sort-value="0.84" | 840 m || 
|-id=066 bgcolor=#d6d6d6
| 340066 ||  || — || November 4, 2005 || Kitt Peak || Spacewatch || HIL3:2 || align=right | 6.1 km || 
|-id=067 bgcolor=#fefefe
| 340067 ||  || — || October 28, 2005 || Kitt Peak || Spacewatch || V || align=right data-sort-value="0.67" | 670 m || 
|-id=068 bgcolor=#fefefe
| 340068 ||  || — || November 1, 2005 || Mount Lemmon || Mount Lemmon Survey || MAS || align=right data-sort-value="0.80" | 800 m || 
|-id=069 bgcolor=#fefefe
| 340069 ||  || — || November 6, 2005 || Mount Lemmon || Mount Lemmon Survey || — || align=right | 1.1 km || 
|-id=070 bgcolor=#fefefe
| 340070 ||  || — || November 5, 2005 || Kitt Peak || Spacewatch || — || align=right data-sort-value="0.75" | 750 m || 
|-id=071 bgcolor=#fefefe
| 340071 Vanmunster ||  ||  || November 9, 2005 || Uccle || P. De Cat || — || align=right data-sort-value="0.91" | 910 m || 
|-id=072 bgcolor=#fefefe
| 340072 ||  || — || November 5, 2005 || Kitt Peak || Spacewatch || — || align=right data-sort-value="0.72" | 720 m || 
|-id=073 bgcolor=#fefefe
| 340073 ||  || — || November 10, 2005 || Kitt Peak || Spacewatch || NYS || align=right data-sort-value="0.76" | 760 m || 
|-id=074 bgcolor=#E9E9E9
| 340074 ||  || — || November 12, 2005 || Kitt Peak || Spacewatch || — || align=right | 2.6 km || 
|-id=075 bgcolor=#fefefe
| 340075 ||  || — || November 21, 2005 || Kitt Peak || Spacewatch || ERI || align=right | 1.7 km || 
|-id=076 bgcolor=#fefefe
| 340076 ||  || — || November 21, 2005 || Catalina || CSS || — || align=right | 1.1 km || 
|-id=077 bgcolor=#fefefe
| 340077 ||  || — || November 21, 2005 || Junk Bond || D. Healy || MASfast? || align=right data-sort-value="0.88" | 880 m || 
|-id=078 bgcolor=#fefefe
| 340078 ||  || — || November 22, 2005 || Kitt Peak || Spacewatch || NYS || align=right data-sort-value="0.84" | 840 m || 
|-id=079 bgcolor=#fefefe
| 340079 ||  || — || November 22, 2005 || Kitt Peak || Spacewatch || — || align=right data-sort-value="0.59" | 590 m || 
|-id=080 bgcolor=#fefefe
| 340080 ||  || — || November 21, 2005 || Kitt Peak || Spacewatch || NYS || align=right data-sort-value="0.81" | 810 m || 
|-id=081 bgcolor=#fefefe
| 340081 ||  || — || November 21, 2005 || Kitt Peak || Spacewatch || — || align=right | 1.00 km || 
|-id=082 bgcolor=#d6d6d6
| 340082 ||  || — || November 21, 2005 || Kitt Peak || Spacewatch || SHU3:2 || align=right | 5.5 km || 
|-id=083 bgcolor=#fefefe
| 340083 ||  || — || November 21, 2005 || Kitt Peak || Spacewatch || MAS || align=right data-sort-value="0.78" | 780 m || 
|-id=084 bgcolor=#fefefe
| 340084 ||  || — || November 21, 2005 || Kitt Peak || Spacewatch || — || align=right data-sort-value="0.80" | 800 m || 
|-id=085 bgcolor=#fefefe
| 340085 ||  || — || November 21, 2005 || Kitt Peak || Spacewatch || — || align=right data-sort-value="0.75" | 750 m || 
|-id=086 bgcolor=#d6d6d6
| 340086 ||  || — || November 21, 2005 || Kitt Peak || Spacewatch || 3:2 || align=right | 6.4 km || 
|-id=087 bgcolor=#fefefe
| 340087 ||  || — || November 22, 2005 || Kitt Peak || Spacewatch || MAS || align=right data-sort-value="0.90" | 900 m || 
|-id=088 bgcolor=#fefefe
| 340088 ||  || — || November 25, 2005 || Mount Lemmon || Mount Lemmon Survey || MAS || align=right data-sort-value="0.86" | 860 m || 
|-id=089 bgcolor=#fefefe
| 340089 ||  || — || November 21, 2005 || Kitt Peak || Spacewatch || ERI || align=right | 1.8 km || 
|-id=090 bgcolor=#fefefe
| 340090 ||  || — || November 25, 2005 || Kitt Peak || Spacewatch || MAS || align=right data-sort-value="0.81" | 810 m || 
|-id=091 bgcolor=#fefefe
| 340091 ||  || — || November 25, 2005 || Kitt Peak || Spacewatch || V || align=right data-sort-value="0.82" | 820 m || 
|-id=092 bgcolor=#fefefe
| 340092 ||  || — || November 26, 2005 || Mount Lemmon || Mount Lemmon Survey || EUT || align=right data-sort-value="0.72" | 720 m || 
|-id=093 bgcolor=#FA8072
| 340093 ||  || — || November 29, 2005 || Socorro || LINEAR || — || align=right | 1.2 km || 
|-id=094 bgcolor=#fefefe
| 340094 ||  || — || November 22, 2005 || Kitt Peak || Spacewatch || ERI || align=right | 2.1 km || 
|-id=095 bgcolor=#fefefe
| 340095 ||  || — || November 21, 2005 || Kitt Peak || Spacewatch || ERI || align=right | 1.8 km || 
|-id=096 bgcolor=#fefefe
| 340096 ||  || — || November 26, 2005 || Mount Lemmon || Mount Lemmon Survey || V || align=right data-sort-value="0.92" | 920 m || 
|-id=097 bgcolor=#fefefe
| 340097 ||  || — || November 25, 2005 || Kitt Peak || Spacewatch || NYS || align=right | 1.5 km || 
|-id=098 bgcolor=#fefefe
| 340098 ||  || — || November 26, 2005 || Kitt Peak || Spacewatch || MAS || align=right data-sort-value="0.71" | 710 m || 
|-id=099 bgcolor=#fefefe
| 340099 ||  || — || November 29, 2005 || Socorro || LINEAR || — || align=right | 1.0 km || 
|-id=100 bgcolor=#fefefe
| 340100 ||  || — || November 29, 2005 || Kitt Peak || Spacewatch || fast? || align=right data-sort-value="0.94" | 940 m || 
|}

340101–340200 

|-bgcolor=#fefefe
| 340101 ||  || — || November 29, 2005 || Socorro || LINEAR || MAS || align=right data-sort-value="0.89" | 890 m || 
|-id=102 bgcolor=#d6d6d6
| 340102 ||  || — || November 30, 2005 || Kitt Peak || Spacewatch || SHU3:2 || align=right | 6.4 km || 
|-id=103 bgcolor=#fefefe
| 340103 ||  || — || November 30, 2005 || Socorro || LINEAR || — || align=right | 1.1 km || 
|-id=104 bgcolor=#fefefe
| 340104 ||  || — || November 28, 2005 || Socorro || LINEAR || ERI || align=right | 1.8 km || 
|-id=105 bgcolor=#fefefe
| 340105 ||  || — || November 28, 2005 || Catalina || CSS || — || align=right | 1.0 km || 
|-id=106 bgcolor=#fefefe
| 340106 ||  || — || November 30, 2005 || Socorro || LINEAR || MAS || align=right data-sort-value="0.69" | 690 m || 
|-id=107 bgcolor=#d6d6d6
| 340107 ||  || — || November 25, 2005 || Mount Lemmon || Mount Lemmon Survey || 3:2 || align=right | 3.9 km || 
|-id=108 bgcolor=#fefefe
| 340108 ||  || — || November 26, 2005 || Mount Lemmon || Mount Lemmon Survey || MAS || align=right data-sort-value="0.76" | 760 m || 
|-id=109 bgcolor=#fefefe
| 340109 ||  || — || November 25, 2005 || Kitt Peak || Spacewatch || — || align=right data-sort-value="0.91" | 910 m || 
|-id=110 bgcolor=#fefefe
| 340110 ||  || — || November 25, 2005 || Catalina || CSS || V || align=right data-sort-value="0.73" | 730 m || 
|-id=111 bgcolor=#d6d6d6
| 340111 ||  || — || November 29, 2005 || Palomar || NEAT || HIL3:2 || align=right | 6.0 km || 
|-id=112 bgcolor=#fefefe
| 340112 ||  || — || October 22, 2005 || Kitt Peak || Spacewatch || — || align=right | 1.2 km || 
|-id=113 bgcolor=#fefefe
| 340113 ||  || — || November 30, 2005 || Kitt Peak || Spacewatch || — || align=right | 1.1 km || 
|-id=114 bgcolor=#fefefe
| 340114 ||  || — || November 30, 2005 || Kitt Peak || Spacewatch || V || align=right data-sort-value="0.90" | 900 m || 
|-id=115 bgcolor=#fefefe
| 340115 ||  || — || November 30, 2005 || Kitt Peak || Spacewatch || — || align=right data-sort-value="0.70" | 700 m || 
|-id=116 bgcolor=#fefefe
| 340116 ||  || — || November 25, 2005 || Catalina || CSS || — || align=right | 1.0 km || 
|-id=117 bgcolor=#fefefe
| 340117 ||  || — || November 26, 2005 || Socorro || LINEAR || — || align=right | 1.2 km || 
|-id=118 bgcolor=#fefefe
| 340118 ||  || — || November 26, 2005 || Catalina || CSS || — || align=right data-sort-value="0.94" | 940 m || 
|-id=119 bgcolor=#fefefe
| 340119 ||  || — || November 28, 2005 || Socorro || LINEAR || — || align=right data-sort-value="0.89" | 890 m || 
|-id=120 bgcolor=#fefefe
| 340120 ||  || — || November 21, 2005 || Kitt Peak || Spacewatch || NYS || align=right data-sort-value="0.65" | 650 m || 
|-id=121 bgcolor=#d6d6d6
| 340121 ||  || — || November 25, 2005 || Kitt Peak || Spacewatch || HIL3:2 || align=right | 6.0 km || 
|-id=122 bgcolor=#fefefe
| 340122 ||  || — || November 28, 2005 || Kitt Peak || Spacewatch || V || align=right data-sort-value="0.67" | 670 m || 
|-id=123 bgcolor=#fefefe
| 340123 ||  || — || November 29, 2005 || Mount Lemmon || Mount Lemmon Survey || MAS || align=right data-sort-value="0.80" | 800 m || 
|-id=124 bgcolor=#fefefe
| 340124 ||  || — || December 1, 2005 || Socorro || LINEAR || ERI || align=right | 2.3 km || 
|-id=125 bgcolor=#E9E9E9
| 340125 ||  || — || December 4, 2005 || Kitt Peak || Spacewatch || — || align=right | 4.7 km || 
|-id=126 bgcolor=#fefefe
| 340126 ||  || — || December 1, 2005 || Kitt Peak || Spacewatch || — || align=right data-sort-value="0.79" | 790 m || 
|-id=127 bgcolor=#fefefe
| 340127 ||  || — || December 1, 2005 || Kitt Peak || Spacewatch || NYS || align=right data-sort-value="0.88" | 880 m || 
|-id=128 bgcolor=#fefefe
| 340128 ||  || — || December 2, 2005 || Socorro || LINEAR || NYS || align=right data-sort-value="0.73" | 730 m || 
|-id=129 bgcolor=#fefefe
| 340129 ||  || — || December 4, 2005 || Kitt Peak || Spacewatch || MAS || align=right data-sort-value="0.75" | 750 m || 
|-id=130 bgcolor=#fefefe
| 340130 ||  || — || December 6, 2005 || Kitt Peak || Spacewatch || — || align=right data-sort-value="0.62" | 620 m || 
|-id=131 bgcolor=#fefefe
| 340131 ||  || — || December 2, 2005 || Kitt Peak || Spacewatch || NYS || align=right data-sort-value="0.66" | 660 m || 
|-id=132 bgcolor=#fefefe
| 340132 ||  || — || December 6, 2005 || Kitt Peak || Spacewatch || — || align=right | 1.1 km || 
|-id=133 bgcolor=#fefefe
| 340133 ||  || — || December 8, 2005 || Mount Lemmon || Mount Lemmon Survey || NYS || align=right data-sort-value="0.75" | 750 m || 
|-id=134 bgcolor=#fefefe
| 340134 ||  || — || December 8, 2005 || Catalina || CSS || FLO || align=right data-sort-value="0.96" | 960 m || 
|-id=135 bgcolor=#fefefe
| 340135 ||  || — || December 7, 2005 || Kitt Peak || Spacewatch || V || align=right data-sort-value="0.80" | 800 m || 
|-id=136 bgcolor=#fefefe
| 340136 ||  || — || December 21, 2005 || Catalina || CSS || — || align=right | 1.9 km || 
|-id=137 bgcolor=#fefefe
| 340137 ||  || — || December 22, 2005 || Kitt Peak || Spacewatch || — || align=right data-sort-value="0.97" | 970 m || 
|-id=138 bgcolor=#fefefe
| 340138 ||  || — || December 24, 2005 || Kitt Peak || Spacewatch || — || align=right | 1.1 km || 
|-id=139 bgcolor=#fefefe
| 340139 ||  || — || December 24, 2005 || Kitt Peak || Spacewatch || NYS || align=right data-sort-value="0.89" | 890 m || 
|-id=140 bgcolor=#fefefe
| 340140 ||  || — || December 24, 2005 || Kitt Peak || Spacewatch || NYS || align=right data-sort-value="0.69" | 690 m || 
|-id=141 bgcolor=#fefefe
| 340141 ||  || — || December 24, 2005 || Kitt Peak || Spacewatch || NYS || align=right data-sort-value="0.71" | 710 m || 
|-id=142 bgcolor=#fefefe
| 340142 ||  || — || December 26, 2005 || Catalina || CSS || NYS || align=right data-sort-value="0.95" | 950 m || 
|-id=143 bgcolor=#fefefe
| 340143 ||  || — || December 24, 2005 || Kitt Peak || Spacewatch || ERI || align=right | 2.0 km || 
|-id=144 bgcolor=#fefefe
| 340144 ||  || — || December 24, 2005 || Kitt Peak || Spacewatch || PHO || align=right | 1.3 km || 
|-id=145 bgcolor=#E9E9E9
| 340145 ||  || — || December 26, 2005 || Mount Lemmon || Mount Lemmon Survey || — || align=right | 1.5 km || 
|-id=146 bgcolor=#fefefe
| 340146 ||  || — || December 26, 2005 || Mount Lemmon || Mount Lemmon Survey || NYS || align=right data-sort-value="0.72" | 720 m || 
|-id=147 bgcolor=#fefefe
| 340147 ||  || — || December 24, 2005 || Kitt Peak || Spacewatch || MAS || align=right data-sort-value="0.76" | 760 m || 
|-id=148 bgcolor=#d6d6d6
| 340148 ||  || — || December 24, 2005 || Kitt Peak || Spacewatch || SHU3:2 || align=right | 7.6 km || 
|-id=149 bgcolor=#fefefe
| 340149 ||  || — || December 24, 2005 || Kitt Peak || Spacewatch || V || align=right data-sort-value="0.87" | 870 m || 
|-id=150 bgcolor=#fefefe
| 340150 ||  || — || December 22, 2005 || Kitt Peak || Spacewatch || — || align=right | 1.0 km || 
|-id=151 bgcolor=#fefefe
| 340151 ||  || — || December 24, 2005 || Kitt Peak || Spacewatch || — || align=right | 1.0 km || 
|-id=152 bgcolor=#E9E9E9
| 340152 ||  || — || December 24, 2005 || Kitt Peak || Spacewatch || — || align=right | 1.4 km || 
|-id=153 bgcolor=#fefefe
| 340153 ||  || — || December 24, 2005 || Kitt Peak || Spacewatch || MAS || align=right data-sort-value="0.59" | 590 m || 
|-id=154 bgcolor=#fefefe
| 340154 ||  || — || December 26, 2005 || Mount Lemmon || Mount Lemmon Survey || — || align=right data-sort-value="0.76" | 760 m || 
|-id=155 bgcolor=#fefefe
| 340155 ||  || — || December 27, 2005 || Mount Lemmon || Mount Lemmon Survey || — || align=right data-sort-value="0.76" | 760 m || 
|-id=156 bgcolor=#fefefe
| 340156 ||  || — || December 24, 2005 || Kitt Peak || Spacewatch || FLO || align=right data-sort-value="0.81" | 810 m || 
|-id=157 bgcolor=#fefefe
| 340157 ||  || — || December 28, 2005 || Mount Lemmon || Mount Lemmon Survey || — || align=right data-sort-value="0.89" | 890 m || 
|-id=158 bgcolor=#fefefe
| 340158 ||  || — || December 28, 2005 || Kitt Peak || Spacewatch || — || align=right data-sort-value="0.85" | 850 m || 
|-id=159 bgcolor=#fefefe
| 340159 ||  || — || December 25, 2005 || Kitt Peak || Spacewatch || — || align=right | 1.1 km || 
|-id=160 bgcolor=#fefefe
| 340160 ||  || — || December 25, 2005 || Mount Lemmon || Mount Lemmon Survey || CLA || align=right | 1.9 km || 
|-id=161 bgcolor=#fefefe
| 340161 ||  || — || December 25, 2005 || Kitt Peak || Spacewatch || NYS || align=right data-sort-value="0.92" | 920 m || 
|-id=162 bgcolor=#E9E9E9
| 340162 ||  || — || December 27, 2005 || Mount Lemmon || Mount Lemmon Survey || — || align=right | 1.3 km || 
|-id=163 bgcolor=#fefefe
| 340163 ||  || — || December 26, 2005 || Kitt Peak || Spacewatch || — || align=right | 1.2 km || 
|-id=164 bgcolor=#E9E9E9
| 340164 ||  || — || December 27, 2005 || Mount Lemmon || Mount Lemmon Survey || EUN || align=right | 1.5 km || 
|-id=165 bgcolor=#fefefe
| 340165 ||  || — || December 28, 2005 || Mount Lemmon || Mount Lemmon Survey || ERI || align=right | 1.4 km || 
|-id=166 bgcolor=#fefefe
| 340166 ||  || — || December 28, 2005 || Mount Lemmon || Mount Lemmon Survey || NYS || align=right data-sort-value="0.53" | 530 m || 
|-id=167 bgcolor=#fefefe
| 340167 ||  || — || December 29, 2005 || Mount Lemmon || Mount Lemmon Survey || — || align=right | 1.0 km || 
|-id=168 bgcolor=#fefefe
| 340168 ||  || — || December 25, 2005 || Kitt Peak || Spacewatch || NYS || align=right data-sort-value="0.90" | 900 m || 
|-id=169 bgcolor=#fefefe
| 340169 ||  || — || December 25, 2005 || Kitt Peak || Spacewatch || NYS || align=right data-sort-value="0.70" | 700 m || 
|-id=170 bgcolor=#fefefe
| 340170 ||  || — || December 26, 2005 || Kitt Peak || Spacewatch || NYS || align=right data-sort-value="0.82" | 820 m || 
|-id=171 bgcolor=#fefefe
| 340171 ||  || — || December 29, 2005 || Socorro || LINEAR || — || align=right | 1.1 km || 
|-id=172 bgcolor=#fefefe
| 340172 ||  || — || December 27, 2005 || Kitt Peak || Spacewatch || V || align=right | 1.1 km || 
|-id=173 bgcolor=#fefefe
| 340173 ||  || — || December 24, 2005 || Socorro || LINEAR || — || align=right | 1.1 km || 
|-id=174 bgcolor=#E9E9E9
| 340174 ||  || — || December 22, 2005 || Kitt Peak || Spacewatch || — || align=right | 1.4 km || 
|-id=175 bgcolor=#fefefe
| 340175 ||  || — || December 24, 2005 || Kitt Peak || Spacewatch || NYS || align=right data-sort-value="0.96" | 960 m || 
|-id=176 bgcolor=#fefefe
| 340176 ||  || — || December 30, 2005 || Socorro || LINEAR || — || align=right data-sort-value="0.84" | 840 m || 
|-id=177 bgcolor=#E9E9E9
| 340177 ||  || — || December 30, 2005 || Socorro || LINEAR || — || align=right | 2.2 km || 
|-id=178 bgcolor=#fefefe
| 340178 ||  || — || December 27, 2005 || Kitt Peak || Spacewatch || KLI || align=right | 2.5 km || 
|-id=179 bgcolor=#fefefe
| 340179 ||  || — || December 28, 2005 || Mount Lemmon || Mount Lemmon Survey || MAS || align=right data-sort-value="0.57" | 570 m || 
|-id=180 bgcolor=#E9E9E9
| 340180 ||  || — || December 28, 2005 || Mount Lemmon || Mount Lemmon Survey || — || align=right | 1.0 km || 
|-id=181 bgcolor=#fefefe
| 340181 ||  || — || December 28, 2005 || Mount Lemmon || Mount Lemmon Survey || H || align=right data-sort-value="0.77" | 770 m || 
|-id=182 bgcolor=#fefefe
| 340182 ||  || — || December 30, 2005 || Kitt Peak || Spacewatch || — || align=right | 1.0 km || 
|-id=183 bgcolor=#fefefe
| 340183 ||  || — || December 30, 2005 || Kitt Peak || Spacewatch || V || align=right data-sort-value="0.97" | 970 m || 
|-id=184 bgcolor=#d6d6d6
| 340184 ||  || — || December 24, 2005 || Kitt Peak || Spacewatch || 3:2 || align=right | 3.7 km || 
|-id=185 bgcolor=#fefefe
| 340185 ||  || — || December 25, 2005 || Mount Lemmon || Mount Lemmon Survey || — || align=right data-sort-value="0.87" | 870 m || 
|-id=186 bgcolor=#fefefe
| 340186 ||  || — || December 27, 2005 || Kitt Peak || Spacewatch || NYS || align=right data-sort-value="0.58" | 580 m || 
|-id=187 bgcolor=#fefefe
| 340187 ||  || — || December 31, 2005 || Kitt Peak || Spacewatch || KLI || align=right | 3.3 km || 
|-id=188 bgcolor=#fefefe
| 340188 ||  || — || December 26, 2005 || Kitt Peak || Spacewatch || NYS || align=right data-sort-value="0.76" | 760 m || 
|-id=189 bgcolor=#fefefe
| 340189 ||  || — || December 26, 2005 || Kitt Peak || Spacewatch || — || align=right | 1.1 km || 
|-id=190 bgcolor=#fefefe
| 340190 ||  || — || December 29, 2005 || Kitt Peak || Spacewatch || — || align=right data-sort-value="0.99" | 990 m || 
|-id=191 bgcolor=#fefefe
| 340191 ||  || — || December 25, 2005 || Kitt Peak || Spacewatch || — || align=right data-sort-value="0.79" | 790 m || 
|-id=192 bgcolor=#fefefe
| 340192 ||  || — || December 25, 2005 || Mount Lemmon || Mount Lemmon Survey || — || align=right data-sort-value="0.85" | 850 m || 
|-id=193 bgcolor=#E9E9E9
| 340193 ||  || — || December 25, 2005 || Mount Lemmon || Mount Lemmon Survey || — || align=right | 2.3 km || 
|-id=194 bgcolor=#fefefe
| 340194 ||  || — || December 28, 2005 || Kitt Peak || Spacewatch || — || align=right data-sort-value="0.87" | 870 m || 
|-id=195 bgcolor=#fefefe
| 340195 ||  || — || December 25, 2005 || Catalina || CSS || — || align=right | 1.2 km || 
|-id=196 bgcolor=#fefefe
| 340196 ||  || — || March 10, 2003 || Kitt Peak || Spacewatch || NYS || align=right data-sort-value="0.73" | 730 m || 
|-id=197 bgcolor=#E9E9E9
| 340197 ||  || — || December 25, 2005 || Mount Lemmon || Mount Lemmon Survey || — || align=right data-sort-value="0.86" | 860 m || 
|-id=198 bgcolor=#fefefe
| 340198 ||  || — || December 30, 2005 || Kitt Peak || Spacewatch || — || align=right | 1.1 km || 
|-id=199 bgcolor=#fefefe
| 340199 ||  || — || January 2, 2006 || Catalina || CSS || CHL || align=right | 2.5 km || 
|-id=200 bgcolor=#fefefe
| 340200 ||  || — || January 4, 2006 || Kitt Peak || Spacewatch || V || align=right data-sort-value="0.76" | 760 m || 
|}

340201–340300 

|-bgcolor=#E9E9E9
| 340201 ||  || — || January 5, 2006 || Mount Lemmon || Mount Lemmon Survey || — || align=right | 1.2 km || 
|-id=202 bgcolor=#fefefe
| 340202 ||  || — || January 4, 2006 || Mount Lemmon || Mount Lemmon Survey || — || align=right | 1.2 km || 
|-id=203 bgcolor=#fefefe
| 340203 ||  || — || January 5, 2006 || Kitt Peak || Spacewatch || MAS || align=right data-sort-value="0.71" | 710 m || 
|-id=204 bgcolor=#fefefe
| 340204 ||  || — || January 6, 2006 || Socorro || LINEAR || ERI || align=right | 3.0 km || 
|-id=205 bgcolor=#fefefe
| 340205 ||  || — || January 6, 2006 || Socorro || LINEAR || — || align=right | 1.6 km || 
|-id=206 bgcolor=#fefefe
| 340206 ||  || — || January 6, 2006 || Socorro || LINEAR || — || align=right | 1.8 km || 
|-id=207 bgcolor=#fefefe
| 340207 ||  || — || January 6, 2006 || Socorro || LINEAR || — || align=right data-sort-value="0.86" | 860 m || 
|-id=208 bgcolor=#E9E9E9
| 340208 ||  || — || January 7, 2006 || Mount Lemmon || Mount Lemmon Survey || — || align=right | 3.6 km || 
|-id=209 bgcolor=#fefefe
| 340209 ||  || — || January 5, 2006 || Kitt Peak || Spacewatch || NYS || align=right data-sort-value="0.53" | 530 m || 
|-id=210 bgcolor=#fefefe
| 340210 ||  || — || January 5, 2006 || Kitt Peak || Spacewatch || — || align=right data-sort-value="0.66" | 660 m || 
|-id=211 bgcolor=#fefefe
| 340211 ||  || — || January 5, 2006 || Kitt Peak || Spacewatch || NYS || align=right data-sort-value="0.59" | 590 m || 
|-id=212 bgcolor=#fefefe
| 340212 ||  || — || January 6, 2006 || Kitt Peak || Spacewatch || NYSfast? || align=right data-sort-value="0.90" | 900 m || 
|-id=213 bgcolor=#fefefe
| 340213 ||  || — || January 6, 2006 || Mount Lemmon || Mount Lemmon Survey || V || align=right data-sort-value="0.95" | 950 m || 
|-id=214 bgcolor=#fefefe
| 340214 ||  || — || January 5, 2006 || Catalina || CSS || V || align=right | 1.2 km || 
|-id=215 bgcolor=#d6d6d6
| 340215 ||  || — || January 6, 2006 || Socorro || LINEAR || HIL || align=right | 6.0 km || 
|-id=216 bgcolor=#E9E9E9
| 340216 ||  || — || December 29, 2005 || Kitt Peak || Spacewatch || — || align=right | 1.0 km || 
|-id=217 bgcolor=#E9E9E9
| 340217 ||  || — || January 6, 2006 || Catalina || CSS || EUN || align=right | 1.6 km || 
|-id=218 bgcolor=#E9E9E9
| 340218 ||  || — || January 7, 2006 || Catalina || CSS || — || align=right | 2.6 km || 
|-id=219 bgcolor=#fefefe
| 340219 ||  || — || January 7, 2006 || Mount Lemmon || Mount Lemmon Survey || — || align=right data-sort-value="0.94" | 940 m || 
|-id=220 bgcolor=#E9E9E9
| 340220 ||  || — || January 20, 2006 || Catalina || CSS || EUN || align=right | 2.0 km || 
|-id=221 bgcolor=#fefefe
| 340221 ||  || — || January 21, 2006 || Kitt Peak || Spacewatch || MAS || align=right data-sort-value="0.93" | 930 m || 
|-id=222 bgcolor=#fefefe
| 340222 ||  || — || January 23, 2006 || Mount Lemmon || Mount Lemmon Survey || — || align=right data-sort-value="0.83" | 830 m || 
|-id=223 bgcolor=#E9E9E9
| 340223 ||  || — || January 21, 2006 || Kitt Peak || Spacewatch || — || align=right | 1.8 km || 
|-id=224 bgcolor=#d6d6d6
| 340224 ||  || — || January 25, 2006 || Mount Lemmon || Mount Lemmon Survey || SHU3:2 || align=right | 7.6 km || 
|-id=225 bgcolor=#fefefe
| 340225 ||  || — || January 25, 2006 || Kitt Peak || Spacewatch || — || align=right data-sort-value="0.73" | 730 m || 
|-id=226 bgcolor=#fefefe
| 340226 ||  || — || January 18, 2006 || Catalina || CSS || PHO || align=right | 1.2 km || 
|-id=227 bgcolor=#E9E9E9
| 340227 ||  || — || January 20, 2006 || Kitt Peak || Spacewatch || MAR || align=right | 1.2 km || 
|-id=228 bgcolor=#fefefe
| 340228 ||  || — || January 23, 2006 || Kitt Peak || Spacewatch || SUL || align=right | 2.2 km || 
|-id=229 bgcolor=#fefefe
| 340229 ||  || — || January 23, 2006 || Kitt Peak || Spacewatch || NYS || align=right data-sort-value="0.64" | 640 m || 
|-id=230 bgcolor=#E9E9E9
| 340230 ||  || — || January 23, 2006 || Kitt Peak || Spacewatch || KON || align=right | 1.9 km || 
|-id=231 bgcolor=#fefefe
| 340231 ||  || — || January 23, 2006 || Kitt Peak || Spacewatch || — || align=right data-sort-value="0.85" | 850 m || 
|-id=232 bgcolor=#fefefe
| 340232 ||  || — || January 23, 2006 || Catalina || CSS || — || align=right | 1.2 km || 
|-id=233 bgcolor=#E9E9E9
| 340233 ||  || — || January 23, 2006 || Kitt Peak || Spacewatch || — || align=right | 2.2 km || 
|-id=234 bgcolor=#E9E9E9
| 340234 ||  || — || January 23, 2006 || Kitt Peak || Spacewatch || — || align=right | 1.9 km || 
|-id=235 bgcolor=#E9E9E9
| 340235 ||  || — || January 23, 2006 || Kitt Peak || Spacewatch || — || align=right | 1.9 km || 
|-id=236 bgcolor=#C2FFFF
| 340236 ||  || — || January 25, 2006 || Kitt Peak || Spacewatch || L5 || align=right | 10 km || 
|-id=237 bgcolor=#E9E9E9
| 340237 ||  || — || January 25, 2006 || Catalina || CSS || — || align=right | 1.9 km || 
|-id=238 bgcolor=#E9E9E9
| 340238 ||  || — || January 25, 2006 || Kitt Peak || Spacewatch || — || align=right | 1.00 km || 
|-id=239 bgcolor=#E9E9E9
| 340239 ||  || — || January 26, 2006 || Kitt Peak || Spacewatch || — || align=right data-sort-value="0.91" | 910 m || 
|-id=240 bgcolor=#E9E9E9
| 340240 ||  || — || January 26, 2006 || Kitt Peak || Spacewatch || — || align=right | 1.4 km || 
|-id=241 bgcolor=#E9E9E9
| 340241 ||  || — || January 26, 2006 || Kitt Peak || Spacewatch || — || align=right | 2.2 km || 
|-id=242 bgcolor=#fefefe
| 340242 ||  || — || January 22, 2006 || Catalina || CSS || — || align=right | 1.3 km || 
|-id=243 bgcolor=#fefefe
| 340243 ||  || — || January 25, 2006 || Kitt Peak || Spacewatch || NYS || align=right data-sort-value="0.88" | 880 m || 
|-id=244 bgcolor=#E9E9E9
| 340244 ||  || — || January 26, 2006 || Kitt Peak || Spacewatch || — || align=right | 1.7 km || 
|-id=245 bgcolor=#E9E9E9
| 340245 ||  || — || January 26, 2006 || Kitt Peak || Spacewatch || — || align=right | 2.6 km || 
|-id=246 bgcolor=#fefefe
| 340246 ||  || — || January 26, 2006 || Mount Lemmon || Mount Lemmon Survey || — || align=right data-sort-value="0.95" | 950 m || 
|-id=247 bgcolor=#E9E9E9
| 340247 ||  || — || January 26, 2006 || Kitt Peak || Spacewatch || — || align=right | 1.4 km || 
|-id=248 bgcolor=#E9E9E9
| 340248 ||  || — || January 26, 2006 || Kitt Peak || Spacewatch || MAR || align=right | 1.3 km || 
|-id=249 bgcolor=#E9E9E9
| 340249 ||  || — || January 26, 2006 || Kitt Peak || Spacewatch || — || align=right | 1.1 km || 
|-id=250 bgcolor=#E9E9E9
| 340250 ||  || — || January 26, 2006 || Kitt Peak || Spacewatch || — || align=right data-sort-value="0.90" | 900 m || 
|-id=251 bgcolor=#E9E9E9
| 340251 ||  || — || January 26, 2006 || Kitt Peak || Spacewatch || ADE || align=right | 3.7 km || 
|-id=252 bgcolor=#fefefe
| 340252 ||  || — || January 26, 2006 || Kitt Peak || Spacewatch || V || align=right data-sort-value="0.75" | 750 m || 
|-id=253 bgcolor=#E9E9E9
| 340253 ||  || — || January 26, 2006 || Mount Lemmon || Mount Lemmon Survey || — || align=right data-sort-value="0.86" | 860 m || 
|-id=254 bgcolor=#E9E9E9
| 340254 ||  || — || January 26, 2006 || Kitt Peak || Spacewatch || BRG || align=right | 2.5 km || 
|-id=255 bgcolor=#fefefe
| 340255 ||  || — || January 28, 2006 || Mount Lemmon || Mount Lemmon Survey || MAS || align=right data-sort-value="0.69" | 690 m || 
|-id=256 bgcolor=#fefefe
| 340256 ||  || — || January 30, 2006 || Cordell-Lorenz || Cordell–Lorenz Obs. || — || align=right | 1.2 km || 
|-id=257 bgcolor=#E9E9E9
| 340257 ||  || — || January 26, 2006 || Mount Lemmon || Mount Lemmon Survey || — || align=right | 1.3 km || 
|-id=258 bgcolor=#fefefe
| 340258 ||  || — || January 22, 2006 || Catalina || CSS || H || align=right data-sort-value="0.71" | 710 m || 
|-id=259 bgcolor=#fefefe
| 340259 ||  || — || January 25, 2006 || Kitt Peak || Spacewatch || — || align=right | 1.2 km || 
|-id=260 bgcolor=#E9E9E9
| 340260 ||  || — || January 25, 2006 || Anderson Mesa || LONEOS || EUN || align=right | 1.5 km || 
|-id=261 bgcolor=#E9E9E9
| 340261 ||  || — || January 25, 2006 || Kitt Peak || Spacewatch || — || align=right | 1.4 km || 
|-id=262 bgcolor=#C2FFFF
| 340262 ||  || — || January 25, 2006 || Kitt Peak || Spacewatch || L5 || align=right | 14 km || 
|-id=263 bgcolor=#E9E9E9
| 340263 ||  || — || January 25, 2006 || Kitt Peak || Spacewatch || — || align=right | 1.4 km || 
|-id=264 bgcolor=#E9E9E9
| 340264 ||  || — || January 26, 2006 || Kitt Peak || Spacewatch || — || align=right | 2.2 km || 
|-id=265 bgcolor=#E9E9E9
| 340265 ||  || — || January 26, 2006 || Anderson Mesa || LONEOS || — || align=right | 3.0 km || 
|-id=266 bgcolor=#fefefe
| 340266 ||  || — || January 26, 2006 || Mount Lemmon || Mount Lemmon Survey || — || align=right data-sort-value="0.85" | 850 m || 
|-id=267 bgcolor=#E9E9E9
| 340267 ||  || — || January 27, 2006 || Kitt Peak || Spacewatch || — || align=right | 1.1 km || 
|-id=268 bgcolor=#fefefe
| 340268 ||  || — || January 27, 2006 || Anderson Mesa || LONEOS || — || align=right data-sort-value="0.99" | 990 m || 
|-id=269 bgcolor=#fefefe
| 340269 ||  || — || January 27, 2006 || Mount Lemmon || Mount Lemmon Survey || — || align=right data-sort-value="0.78" | 780 m || 
|-id=270 bgcolor=#d6d6d6
| 340270 ||  || — || January 27, 2006 || Anderson Mesa || LONEOS || 3:2 || align=right | 4.6 km || 
|-id=271 bgcolor=#E9E9E9
| 340271 ||  || — || January 28, 2006 || Mount Lemmon || Mount Lemmon Survey || — || align=right | 1.0 km || 
|-id=272 bgcolor=#E9E9E9
| 340272 ||  || — || January 28, 2006 || Kitt Peak || Spacewatch || — || align=right | 1.6 km || 
|-id=273 bgcolor=#E9E9E9
| 340273 ||  || — || January 30, 2006 || Kitt Peak || Spacewatch || — || align=right | 1.4 km || 
|-id=274 bgcolor=#fefefe
| 340274 ||  || — || January 30, 2006 || Kitt Peak || Spacewatch || — || align=right data-sort-value="0.97" | 970 m || 
|-id=275 bgcolor=#E9E9E9
| 340275 ||  || — || January 31, 2006 || Kitt Peak || Spacewatch || EUN || align=right | 1.2 km || 
|-id=276 bgcolor=#fefefe
| 340276 ||  || — || January 27, 2006 || Anderson Mesa || LONEOS || — || align=right | 1.1 km || 
|-id=277 bgcolor=#E9E9E9
| 340277 ||  || — || January 30, 2006 || Kitt Peak || Spacewatch || — || align=right | 1.4 km || 
|-id=278 bgcolor=#fefefe
| 340278 ||  || — || January 30, 2006 || Kitt Peak || Spacewatch || MAS || align=right data-sort-value="0.79" | 790 m || 
|-id=279 bgcolor=#fefefe
| 340279 ||  || — || January 31, 2006 || Kitt Peak || Spacewatch || NYS || align=right data-sort-value="0.67" | 670 m || 
|-id=280 bgcolor=#E9E9E9
| 340280 ||  || — || January 31, 2006 || Kitt Peak || Spacewatch || — || align=right | 1.1 km || 
|-id=281 bgcolor=#E9E9E9
| 340281 ||  || — || January 31, 2006 || Kitt Peak || Spacewatch || — || align=right data-sort-value="0.93" | 930 m || 
|-id=282 bgcolor=#E9E9E9
| 340282 ||  || — || January 31, 2006 || Kitt Peak || Spacewatch || RAF || align=right | 1.4 km || 
|-id=283 bgcolor=#E9E9E9
| 340283 ||  || — || January 31, 2006 || Kitt Peak || Spacewatch || — || align=right | 1.3 km || 
|-id=284 bgcolor=#E9E9E9
| 340284 ||  || — || January 27, 2006 || Catalina || CSS || — || align=right | 1.6 km || 
|-id=285 bgcolor=#fefefe
| 340285 ||  || — || January 26, 2006 || Catalina || CSS || MAS || align=right | 1.1 km || 
|-id=286 bgcolor=#E9E9E9
| 340286 ||  || — || January 23, 2006 || Kitt Peak || Spacewatch || — || align=right | 1.7 km || 
|-id=287 bgcolor=#E9E9E9
| 340287 ||  || — || January 23, 2006 || Kitt Peak || Spacewatch || — || align=right | 1.1 km || 
|-id=288 bgcolor=#C2FFFF
| 340288 ||  || — || January 31, 2006 || Kitt Peak || Spacewatch || L5 || align=right | 9.0 km || 
|-id=289 bgcolor=#C2FFFF
| 340289 ||  || — || January 23, 2006 || Kitt Peak || Spacewatch || L5 || align=right | 9.1 km || 
|-id=290 bgcolor=#fefefe
| 340290 ||  || — || January 23, 2006 || Kitt Peak || Spacewatch || — || align=right data-sort-value="0.99" | 990 m || 
|-id=291 bgcolor=#FFC2E0
| 340291 ||  || — || February 3, 2006 || Catalina || CSS || APO || align=right data-sort-value="0.38" | 380 m || 
|-id=292 bgcolor=#E9E9E9
| 340292 ||  || — || February 1, 2006 || Mount Lemmon || Mount Lemmon Survey || — || align=right | 1.00 km || 
|-id=293 bgcolor=#E9E9E9
| 340293 ||  || — || February 1, 2006 || Mount Lemmon || Mount Lemmon Survey || — || align=right | 1.7 km || 
|-id=294 bgcolor=#E9E9E9
| 340294 ||  || — || February 1, 2006 || Mount Lemmon || Mount Lemmon Survey || — || align=right | 1.1 km || 
|-id=295 bgcolor=#E9E9E9
| 340295 ||  || — || February 1, 2006 || Mount Lemmon || Mount Lemmon Survey || HNS || align=right | 1.7 km || 
|-id=296 bgcolor=#FA8072
| 340296 ||  || — || February 2, 2006 || Mount Lemmon || Mount Lemmon Survey || H || align=right data-sort-value="0.80" | 800 m || 
|-id=297 bgcolor=#E9E9E9
| 340297 ||  || — || February 1, 2006 || Kitt Peak || Spacewatch || — || align=right | 1.2 km || 
|-id=298 bgcolor=#E9E9E9
| 340298 ||  || — || February 2, 2006 || Kitt Peak || Spacewatch || — || align=right | 1.0 km || 
|-id=299 bgcolor=#E9E9E9
| 340299 ||  || — || February 2, 2006 || Mount Lemmon || Mount Lemmon Survey || — || align=right | 1.8 km || 
|-id=300 bgcolor=#E9E9E9
| 340300 ||  || — || February 2, 2006 || Mount Lemmon || Mount Lemmon Survey || — || align=right | 1.1 km || 
|}

340301–340400 

|-bgcolor=#E9E9E9
| 340301 ||  || — || February 3, 2006 || Kitt Peak || Spacewatch || — || align=right | 1.1 km || 
|-id=302 bgcolor=#E9E9E9
| 340302 ||  || — || February 3, 2006 || Kitt Peak || Spacewatch || — || align=right | 1.6 km || 
|-id=303 bgcolor=#E9E9E9
| 340303 ||  || — || February 3, 2006 || Mount Lemmon || Mount Lemmon Survey || — || align=right | 3.1 km || 
|-id=304 bgcolor=#E9E9E9
| 340304 ||  || — || July 8, 2003 || Palomar || NEAT || — || align=right | 2.8 km || 
|-id=305 bgcolor=#E9E9E9
| 340305 ||  || — || February 1, 2006 || Catalina || CSS || — || align=right | 3.5 km || 
|-id=306 bgcolor=#C2FFFF
| 340306 ||  || — || February 4, 2006 || Kitt Peak || Spacewatch || L5 || align=right | 9.6 km || 
|-id=307 bgcolor=#fefefe
| 340307 || 2006 DJ || — || February 17, 2006 || Pla D'Arguines || R. Ferrando, M. Ferrando || ERI || align=right | 2.6 km || 
|-id=308 bgcolor=#FA8072
| 340308 ||  || — || February 21, 2006 || Catalina || CSS || H || align=right data-sort-value="0.83" | 830 m || 
|-id=309 bgcolor=#E9E9E9
| 340309 ||  || — || February 20, 2006 || Kitt Peak || Spacewatch || — || align=right | 2.2 km || 
|-id=310 bgcolor=#E9E9E9
| 340310 ||  || — || February 20, 2006 || Kitt Peak || Spacewatch || — || align=right | 1.2 km || 
|-id=311 bgcolor=#E9E9E9
| 340311 ||  || — || May 5, 2002 || Palomar || NEAT || — || align=right | 2.6 km || 
|-id=312 bgcolor=#fefefe
| 340312 ||  || — || February 20, 2006 || Catalina || CSS || H || align=right data-sort-value="0.72" | 720 m || 
|-id=313 bgcolor=#E9E9E9
| 340313 ||  || — || February 20, 2006 || Kitt Peak || Spacewatch || JUN || align=right | 1.2 km || 
|-id=314 bgcolor=#E9E9E9
| 340314 ||  || — || February 20, 2006 || Kitt Peak || Spacewatch || — || align=right | 1.4 km || 
|-id=315 bgcolor=#E9E9E9
| 340315 ||  || — || February 20, 2006 || Kitt Peak || Spacewatch || — || align=right data-sort-value="0.93" | 930 m || 
|-id=316 bgcolor=#E9E9E9
| 340316 ||  || — || February 20, 2006 || Kitt Peak || Spacewatch || — || align=right | 1.8 km || 
|-id=317 bgcolor=#E9E9E9
| 340317 ||  || — || February 20, 2006 || Kitt Peak || Spacewatch || — || align=right | 1.4 km || 
|-id=318 bgcolor=#fefefe
| 340318 ||  || — || February 20, 2006 || Kitt Peak || Spacewatch || NYS || align=right data-sort-value="0.68" | 680 m || 
|-id=319 bgcolor=#E9E9E9
| 340319 ||  || — || February 20, 2006 || Kitt Peak || Spacewatch || — || align=right | 1.9 km || 
|-id=320 bgcolor=#E9E9E9
| 340320 ||  || — || February 20, 2006 || Kitt Peak || Spacewatch || — || align=right | 1.3 km || 
|-id=321 bgcolor=#E9E9E9
| 340321 ||  || — || February 20, 2006 || Kitt Peak || Spacewatch || — || align=right | 1.6 km || 
|-id=322 bgcolor=#C2FFFF
| 340322 ||  || — || February 20, 2006 || Kitt Peak || Spacewatch || L5 || align=right | 12 km || 
|-id=323 bgcolor=#C2FFFF
| 340323 ||  || — || February 20, 2006 || Mount Lemmon || Mount Lemmon Survey || L5 || align=right | 10 km || 
|-id=324 bgcolor=#E9E9E9
| 340324 ||  || — || February 20, 2006 || Mount Lemmon || Mount Lemmon Survey || ADE || align=right | 2.2 km || 
|-id=325 bgcolor=#E9E9E9
| 340325 ||  || — || February 20, 2006 || Kitt Peak || Spacewatch || — || align=right | 1.0 km || 
|-id=326 bgcolor=#E9E9E9
| 340326 ||  || — || February 20, 2006 || Mount Lemmon || Mount Lemmon Survey || — || align=right | 1.4 km || 
|-id=327 bgcolor=#C2FFFF
| 340327 ||  || — || February 20, 2006 || Mount Lemmon || Mount Lemmon Survey || L5 || align=right | 11 km || 
|-id=328 bgcolor=#E9E9E9
| 340328 ||  || — || February 20, 2006 || Kitt Peak || Spacewatch || HEN || align=right | 1.1 km || 
|-id=329 bgcolor=#E9E9E9
| 340329 ||  || — || February 20, 2006 || Mount Lemmon || Mount Lemmon Survey || — || align=right | 3.1 km || 
|-id=330 bgcolor=#E9E9E9
| 340330 ||  || — || February 20, 2006 || Mount Lemmon || Mount Lemmon Survey || HNS || align=right | 1.7 km || 
|-id=331 bgcolor=#E9E9E9
| 340331 ||  || — || February 21, 2006 || Mount Lemmon || Mount Lemmon Survey || — || align=right data-sort-value="0.88" | 880 m || 
|-id=332 bgcolor=#E9E9E9
| 340332 ||  || — || February 22, 2006 || Catalina || CSS || — || align=right | 1.7 km || 
|-id=333 bgcolor=#E9E9E9
| 340333 ||  || — || February 22, 2006 || Anderson Mesa || LONEOS || MIT || align=right | 3.0 km || 
|-id=334 bgcolor=#E9E9E9
| 340334 ||  || — || February 20, 2006 || Kitt Peak || Spacewatch || — || align=right | 1.1 km || 
|-id=335 bgcolor=#C2FFFF
| 340335 ||  || — || February 20, 2006 || Kitt Peak || Spacewatch || L5 || align=right | 7.8 km || 
|-id=336 bgcolor=#E9E9E9
| 340336 ||  || — || February 20, 2006 || Catalina || CSS || — || align=right | 2.4 km || 
|-id=337 bgcolor=#E9E9E9
| 340337 ||  || — || February 21, 2006 || Mount Lemmon || Mount Lemmon Survey || — || align=right | 2.0 km || 
|-id=338 bgcolor=#fefefe
| 340338 ||  || — || February 24, 2006 || Kitt Peak || Spacewatch || MAS || align=right data-sort-value="0.56" | 560 m || 
|-id=339 bgcolor=#E9E9E9
| 340339 ||  || — || February 24, 2006 || Kitt Peak || Spacewatch || — || align=right | 1.7 km || 
|-id=340 bgcolor=#E9E9E9
| 340340 ||  || — || February 24, 2006 || Kitt Peak || Spacewatch || — || align=right | 1.2 km || 
|-id=341 bgcolor=#E9E9E9
| 340341 ||  || — || February 24, 2006 || Palomar || NEAT || GER || align=right | 2.1 km || 
|-id=342 bgcolor=#C2FFFF
| 340342 ||  || — || February 24, 2006 || Mount Lemmon || Mount Lemmon Survey || L5 || align=right | 13 km || 
|-id=343 bgcolor=#E9E9E9
| 340343 ||  || — || February 24, 2006 || Mount Lemmon || Mount Lemmon Survey || — || align=right data-sort-value="0.96" | 960 m || 
|-id=344 bgcolor=#E9E9E9
| 340344 ||  || — || February 24, 2006 || Mount Lemmon || Mount Lemmon Survey || GEF || align=right | 1.3 km || 
|-id=345 bgcolor=#E9E9E9
| 340345 ||  || — || February 24, 2006 || Kitt Peak || Spacewatch || — || align=right data-sort-value="0.82" | 820 m || 
|-id=346 bgcolor=#E9E9E9
| 340346 ||  || — || February 25, 2006 || Goodricke-Pigott || R. A. Tucker || — || align=right | 3.9 km || 
|-id=347 bgcolor=#E9E9E9
| 340347 ||  || — || February 22, 2006 || Catalina || CSS || ADE || align=right | 3.6 km || 
|-id=348 bgcolor=#C2FFFF
| 340348 ||  || — || February 21, 2006 || Mount Lemmon || Mount Lemmon Survey || L5 || align=right | 12 km || 
|-id=349 bgcolor=#E9E9E9
| 340349 ||  || — || February 23, 2006 || Kitt Peak || Spacewatch || HNS || align=right | 1.2 km || 
|-id=350 bgcolor=#C2FFFF
| 340350 ||  || — || February 24, 2006 || Kitt Peak || Spacewatch || L5 || align=right | 8.9 km || 
|-id=351 bgcolor=#E9E9E9
| 340351 ||  || — || February 24, 2006 || Kitt Peak || Spacewatch || MRX || align=right | 1.3 km || 
|-id=352 bgcolor=#E9E9E9
| 340352 ||  || — || February 24, 2006 || Kitt Peak || Spacewatch || — || align=right | 1.1 km || 
|-id=353 bgcolor=#E9E9E9
| 340353 ||  || — || February 24, 2006 || Kitt Peak || Spacewatch || — || align=right | 1.3 km || 
|-id=354 bgcolor=#E9E9E9
| 340354 ||  || — || February 24, 2006 || Kitt Peak || Spacewatch || — || align=right | 1.5 km || 
|-id=355 bgcolor=#E9E9E9
| 340355 ||  || — || February 24, 2006 || Kitt Peak || Spacewatch || — || align=right | 2.2 km || 
|-id=356 bgcolor=#E9E9E9
| 340356 ||  || — || February 24, 2006 || Kitt Peak || Spacewatch || — || align=right | 1.2 km || 
|-id=357 bgcolor=#E9E9E9
| 340357 ||  || — || February 24, 2006 || Kitt Peak || Spacewatch || — || align=right | 1.6 km || 
|-id=358 bgcolor=#E9E9E9
| 340358 ||  || — || February 24, 2006 || Kitt Peak || Spacewatch || — || align=right | 2.4 km || 
|-id=359 bgcolor=#fefefe
| 340359 ||  || — || February 24, 2006 || Kitt Peak || Spacewatch || H || align=right data-sort-value="0.69" | 690 m || 
|-id=360 bgcolor=#C2FFFF
| 340360 ||  || — || February 25, 2006 || Kitt Peak || Spacewatch || L5 || align=right | 15 km || 
|-id=361 bgcolor=#E9E9E9
| 340361 ||  || — || February 25, 2006 || Kitt Peak || Spacewatch || — || align=right data-sort-value="0.91" | 910 m || 
|-id=362 bgcolor=#E9E9E9
| 340362 ||  || — || February 25, 2006 || Kitt Peak || Spacewatch || KON || align=right | 3.1 km || 
|-id=363 bgcolor=#E9E9E9
| 340363 ||  || — || February 27, 2006 || Kitt Peak || Spacewatch || — || align=right | 2.5 km || 
|-id=364 bgcolor=#E9E9E9
| 340364 ||  || — || February 24, 2006 || Mount Lemmon || Mount Lemmon Survey || — || align=right | 1.3 km || 
|-id=365 bgcolor=#E9E9E9
| 340365 ||  || — || February 24, 2006 || Palomar || NEAT || — || align=right | 3.4 km || 
|-id=366 bgcolor=#E9E9E9
| 340366 ||  || — || March 21, 2002 || Kitt Peak || Spacewatch || — || align=right | 1.3 km || 
|-id=367 bgcolor=#E9E9E9
| 340367 ||  || — || February 25, 2006 || Kitt Peak || Spacewatch || — || align=right | 1.2 km || 
|-id=368 bgcolor=#E9E9E9
| 340368 ||  || — || February 25, 2006 || Mount Lemmon || Mount Lemmon Survey || — || align=right | 1.9 km || 
|-id=369 bgcolor=#E9E9E9
| 340369 ||  || — || February 25, 2006 || Kitt Peak || Spacewatch || — || align=right | 1.8 km || 
|-id=370 bgcolor=#E9E9E9
| 340370 ||  || — || February 25, 2006 || Mount Lemmon || Mount Lemmon Survey || RAF || align=right | 1.0 km || 
|-id=371 bgcolor=#E9E9E9
| 340371 ||  || — || February 25, 2006 || Kitt Peak || Spacewatch || MIS || align=right | 2.5 km || 
|-id=372 bgcolor=#E9E9E9
| 340372 ||  || — || February 27, 2006 || Kitt Peak || Spacewatch || — || align=right | 1.4 km || 
|-id=373 bgcolor=#E9E9E9
| 340373 ||  || — || February 27, 2006 || Kitt Peak || Spacewatch || — || align=right | 1.7 km || 
|-id=374 bgcolor=#E9E9E9
| 340374 ||  || — || February 27, 2006 || Kitt Peak || Spacewatch || — || align=right | 1.8 km || 
|-id=375 bgcolor=#E9E9E9
| 340375 ||  || — || February 27, 2006 || Kitt Peak || Spacewatch || JUN || align=right | 1.2 km || 
|-id=376 bgcolor=#fefefe
| 340376 ||  || — || February 27, 2006 || Kitt Peak || Spacewatch || MAS || align=right data-sort-value="0.75" | 750 m || 
|-id=377 bgcolor=#E9E9E9
| 340377 ||  || — || February 27, 2006 || Kitt Peak || Spacewatch || — || align=right | 1.5 km || 
|-id=378 bgcolor=#E9E9E9
| 340378 ||  || — || February 27, 2006 || Kitt Peak || Spacewatch || — || align=right | 2.6 km || 
|-id=379 bgcolor=#E9E9E9
| 340379 ||  || — || February 27, 2006 || Kitt Peak || Spacewatch || WIT || align=right | 1.3 km || 
|-id=380 bgcolor=#E9E9E9
| 340380 ||  || — || February 27, 2006 || Kitt Peak || Spacewatch || — || align=right | 1.1 km || 
|-id=381 bgcolor=#E9E9E9
| 340381 ||  || — || February 24, 2006 || Palomar || NEAT || EUN || align=right | 1.8 km || 
|-id=382 bgcolor=#E9E9E9
| 340382 ||  || — || February 24, 2006 || Palomar || NEAT || JUN || align=right | 1.7 km || 
|-id=383 bgcolor=#E9E9E9
| 340383 ||  || — || February 24, 2006 || Palomar || NEAT || ADE || align=right | 4.0 km || 
|-id=384 bgcolor=#E9E9E9
| 340384 ||  || — || February 25, 2006 || Kitt Peak || Spacewatch || — || align=right | 1.2 km || 
|-id=385 bgcolor=#E9E9E9
| 340385 ||  || — || February 27, 2006 || Mount Lemmon || Mount Lemmon Survey || — || align=right | 2.5 km || 
|-id=386 bgcolor=#E9E9E9
| 340386 ||  || — || March 3, 2006 || Nyukasa || Mount Nyukasa Stn. || — || align=right | 1.7 km || 
|-id=387 bgcolor=#E9E9E9
| 340387 ||  || — || March 2, 2006 || Kitt Peak || Spacewatch || — || align=right | 1.1 km || 
|-id=388 bgcolor=#fefefe
| 340388 ||  || — || March 2, 2006 || Kitt Peak || Spacewatch || MAS || align=right data-sort-value="0.67" | 670 m || 
|-id=389 bgcolor=#E9E9E9
| 340389 ||  || — || March 2, 2006 || Kitt Peak || Spacewatch || — || align=right | 1.2 km || 
|-id=390 bgcolor=#E9E9E9
| 340390 ||  || — || March 2, 2006 || Kitt Peak || Spacewatch || — || align=right | 1.7 km || 
|-id=391 bgcolor=#E9E9E9
| 340391 ||  || — || March 2, 2006 || Kitt Peak || Spacewatch || — || align=right | 1.3 km || 
|-id=392 bgcolor=#E9E9E9
| 340392 ||  || — || March 2, 2006 || Mount Lemmon || Mount Lemmon Survey || HEN || align=right | 1.2 km || 
|-id=393 bgcolor=#E9E9E9
| 340393 ||  || — || March 2, 2006 || Kitt Peak || Spacewatch || AEO || align=right | 1.2 km || 
|-id=394 bgcolor=#E9E9E9
| 340394 ||  || — || March 3, 2006 || Mount Lemmon || Mount Lemmon Survey || — || align=right | 2.6 km || 
|-id=395 bgcolor=#E9E9E9
| 340395 ||  || — || March 3, 2006 || Kitt Peak || Spacewatch || — || align=right data-sort-value="0.96" | 960 m || 
|-id=396 bgcolor=#C2FFFF
| 340396 ||  || — || March 3, 2006 || Kitt Peak || Spacewatch || L5 || align=right | 11 km || 
|-id=397 bgcolor=#E9E9E9
| 340397 ||  || — || March 3, 2006 || Mount Lemmon || Mount Lemmon Survey || — || align=right | 1.3 km || 
|-id=398 bgcolor=#E9E9E9
| 340398 ||  || — || March 3, 2006 || Mount Lemmon || Mount Lemmon Survey || — || align=right | 1.2 km || 
|-id=399 bgcolor=#E9E9E9
| 340399 ||  || — || March 3, 2006 || Kitt Peak || Spacewatch || — || align=right | 1.2 km || 
|-id=400 bgcolor=#E9E9E9
| 340400 ||  || — || March 3, 2006 || Kitt Peak || Spacewatch || — || align=right | 1.4 km || 
|}

340401–340500 

|-bgcolor=#fefefe
| 340401 ||  || — || March 3, 2006 || Mount Lemmon || Mount Lemmon Survey || — || align=right | 1.00 km || 
|-id=402 bgcolor=#E9E9E9
| 340402 ||  || — || March 4, 2006 || Kitt Peak || Spacewatch || — || align=right | 2.5 km || 
|-id=403 bgcolor=#E9E9E9
| 340403 ||  || — || March 5, 2006 || Kitt Peak || Spacewatch || — || align=right data-sort-value="0.87" | 870 m || 
|-id=404 bgcolor=#E9E9E9
| 340404 ||  || — || March 5, 2006 || Kitt Peak || Spacewatch || — || align=right | 3.6 km || 
|-id=405 bgcolor=#E9E9E9
| 340405 ||  || — || March 5, 2006 || Kitt Peak || Spacewatch || MRX || align=right | 1.1 km || 
|-id=406 bgcolor=#E9E9E9
| 340406 ||  || — || March 5, 2006 || Kitt Peak || Spacewatch || GER || align=right | 1.6 km || 
|-id=407 bgcolor=#E9E9E9
| 340407 ||  || — || March 5, 2006 || Kitt Peak || Spacewatch || RAF || align=right | 1.1 km || 
|-id=408 bgcolor=#fefefe
| 340408 ||  || — || March 5, 2006 || Kitt Peak || Spacewatch || H || align=right data-sort-value="0.63" | 630 m || 
|-id=409 bgcolor=#d6d6d6
| 340409 ||  || — || March 6, 2006 || Kitt Peak || Spacewatch || EOS || align=right | 2.1 km || 
|-id=410 bgcolor=#E9E9E9
| 340410 ||  || — || March 2, 2006 || Mount Lemmon || Mount Lemmon Survey || — || align=right | 2.0 km || 
|-id=411 bgcolor=#E9E9E9
| 340411 ||  || — || March 21, 2006 || Mount Lemmon || Mount Lemmon Survey || — || align=right | 1.0 km || 
|-id=412 bgcolor=#E9E9E9
| 340412 ||  || — || March 23, 2006 || Kitt Peak || Spacewatch || — || align=right | 1.7 km || 
|-id=413 bgcolor=#E9E9E9
| 340413 ||  || — || March 23, 2006 || Calvin-Rehoboth || Calvin–Rehoboth Obs. || RAF || align=right data-sort-value="0.92" | 920 m || 
|-id=414 bgcolor=#E9E9E9
| 340414 ||  || — || March 26, 2006 || Reedy Creek || J. Broughton || — || align=right | 2.4 km || 
|-id=415 bgcolor=#E9E9E9
| 340415 ||  || — || March 26, 2006 || Reedy Creek || J. Broughton || — || align=right | 2.1 km || 
|-id=416 bgcolor=#E9E9E9
| 340416 ||  || — || March 23, 2006 || Kitt Peak || Spacewatch || HNA || align=right | 2.5 km || 
|-id=417 bgcolor=#E9E9E9
| 340417 ||  || — || March 23, 2006 || Kitt Peak || Spacewatch || — || align=right | 1.6 km || 
|-id=418 bgcolor=#E9E9E9
| 340418 ||  || — || March 23, 2006 || Kitt Peak || Spacewatch || — || align=right | 2.5 km || 
|-id=419 bgcolor=#E9E9E9
| 340419 ||  || — || March 23, 2006 || Mount Lemmon || Mount Lemmon Survey || — || align=right | 1.1 km || 
|-id=420 bgcolor=#d6d6d6
| 340420 ||  || — || March 23, 2006 || Kitt Peak || Spacewatch || — || align=right | 2.3 km || 
|-id=421 bgcolor=#E9E9E9
| 340421 ||  || — || March 23, 2006 || Mount Lemmon || Mount Lemmon Survey || GEF || align=right | 3.8 km || 
|-id=422 bgcolor=#E9E9E9
| 340422 ||  || — || March 23, 2006 || Mount Lemmon || Mount Lemmon Survey || — || align=right | 3.7 km || 
|-id=423 bgcolor=#E9E9E9
| 340423 ||  || — || March 24, 2006 || Kitt Peak || Spacewatch || RAF || align=right | 1.0 km || 
|-id=424 bgcolor=#E9E9E9
| 340424 ||  || — || March 24, 2006 || Kitt Peak || Spacewatch || — || align=right | 2.2 km || 
|-id=425 bgcolor=#E9E9E9
| 340425 ||  || — || March 24, 2006 || Mount Lemmon || Mount Lemmon Survey || — || align=right | 2.1 km || 
|-id=426 bgcolor=#E9E9E9
| 340426 ||  || — || March 24, 2006 || Mount Lemmon || Mount Lemmon Survey || — || align=right | 2.2 km || 
|-id=427 bgcolor=#E9E9E9
| 340427 ||  || — || March 24, 2006 || Mount Lemmon || Mount Lemmon Survey || — || align=right | 1.2 km || 
|-id=428 bgcolor=#E9E9E9
| 340428 ||  || — || March 25, 2006 || Kitt Peak || Spacewatch || — || align=right | 3.0 km || 
|-id=429 bgcolor=#E9E9E9
| 340429 ||  || — || March 25, 2006 || Kitt Peak || Spacewatch || — || align=right | 1.7 km || 
|-id=430 bgcolor=#E9E9E9
| 340430 ||  || — || March 25, 2006 || Kitt Peak || Spacewatch || — || align=right | 2.0 km || 
|-id=431 bgcolor=#fefefe
| 340431 ||  || — || March 24, 2006 || Socorro || LINEAR || H || align=right data-sort-value="0.94" | 940 m || 
|-id=432 bgcolor=#E9E9E9
| 340432 ||  || — || March 23, 2006 || Kitt Peak || Spacewatch || — || align=right | 1.2 km || 
|-id=433 bgcolor=#E9E9E9
| 340433 ||  || — || March 25, 2006 || Palomar || NEAT || — || align=right | 2.0 km || 
|-id=434 bgcolor=#E9E9E9
| 340434 ||  || — || March 26, 2006 || Anderson Mesa || LONEOS || — || align=right | 2.9 km || 
|-id=435 bgcolor=#E9E9E9
| 340435 ||  || — || March 31, 2006 || Anderson Mesa || LONEOS || PAE || align=right | 2.9 km || 
|-id=436 bgcolor=#d6d6d6
| 340436 ||  || — || March 25, 2006 || Kitt Peak || Spacewatch || — || align=right | 2.7 km || 
|-id=437 bgcolor=#E9E9E9
| 340437 ||  || — || March 23, 2006 || Kitt Peak || Spacewatch || EUN || align=right | 1.4 km || 
|-id=438 bgcolor=#E9E9E9
| 340438 ||  || — || April 3, 2006 || Great Shefford || P. Birtwhistle || — || align=right | 2.3 km || 
|-id=439 bgcolor=#E9E9E9
| 340439 ||  || — || April 2, 2006 || Kitt Peak || Spacewatch || — || align=right | 1.6 km || 
|-id=440 bgcolor=#E9E9E9
| 340440 ||  || — || April 2, 2006 || Kitt Peak || Spacewatch || NEM || align=right | 2.4 km || 
|-id=441 bgcolor=#E9E9E9
| 340441 ||  || — || April 2, 2006 || Kitt Peak || Spacewatch || AGN || align=right | 1.4 km || 
|-id=442 bgcolor=#E9E9E9
| 340442 ||  || — || April 2, 2006 || Kitt Peak || Spacewatch || WIT || align=right | 1.1 km || 
|-id=443 bgcolor=#E9E9E9
| 340443 ||  || — || April 2, 2006 || Kitt Peak || Spacewatch || — || align=right | 2.1 km || 
|-id=444 bgcolor=#E9E9E9
| 340444 ||  || — || April 2, 2006 || Kitt Peak || Spacewatch || NEM || align=right | 2.2 km || 
|-id=445 bgcolor=#E9E9E9
| 340445 ||  || — || April 2, 2006 || Kitt Peak || Spacewatch || MRX || align=right | 1.3 km || 
|-id=446 bgcolor=#E9E9E9
| 340446 ||  || — || April 7, 2006 || Kitt Peak || Spacewatch || — || align=right data-sort-value="0.98" | 980 m || 
|-id=447 bgcolor=#E9E9E9
| 340447 ||  || — || April 7, 2006 || Kitt Peak || Spacewatch || — || align=right | 2.0 km || 
|-id=448 bgcolor=#E9E9E9
| 340448 ||  || — || April 7, 2006 || Mount Lemmon || Mount Lemmon Survey || — || align=right | 2.3 km || 
|-id=449 bgcolor=#fefefe
| 340449 ||  || — || April 9, 2006 || Socorro || LINEAR || H || align=right data-sort-value="0.79" | 790 m || 
|-id=450 bgcolor=#E9E9E9
| 340450 ||  || — || April 3, 2006 || Catalina || CSS || JUN || align=right | 1.4 km || 
|-id=451 bgcolor=#E9E9E9
| 340451 ||  || — || April 6, 2006 || Catalina || CSS || — || align=right | 2.2 km || 
|-id=452 bgcolor=#E9E9E9
| 340452 ||  || — || April 7, 2006 || Siding Spring || SSS || MIT || align=right | 3.2 km || 
|-id=453 bgcolor=#E9E9E9
| 340453 ||  || — || April 2, 2006 || Kitt Peak || Spacewatch || — || align=right | 2.2 km || 
|-id=454 bgcolor=#E9E9E9
| 340454 ||  || — || April 9, 2006 || Kitt Peak || Spacewatch || — || align=right | 2.6 km || 
|-id=455 bgcolor=#E9E9E9
| 340455 ||  || — || April 9, 2006 || Kitt Peak || Spacewatch || — || align=right | 1.6 km || 
|-id=456 bgcolor=#E9E9E9
| 340456 ||  || — || April 2, 2006 || Catalina || CSS || — || align=right | 3.4 km || 
|-id=457 bgcolor=#E9E9E9
| 340457 ||  || — || April 18, 2006 || Palomar || NEAT || — || align=right | 3.3 km || 
|-id=458 bgcolor=#d6d6d6
| 340458 ||  || — || April 19, 2006 || Anderson Mesa || LONEOS || — || align=right | 4.4 km || 
|-id=459 bgcolor=#fefefe
| 340459 ||  || — || April 7, 2006 || Mount Lemmon || Mount Lemmon Survey || H || align=right data-sort-value="0.87" | 870 m || 
|-id=460 bgcolor=#E9E9E9
| 340460 ||  || — || April 19, 2006 || Kitt Peak || Spacewatch || — || align=right | 1.3 km || 
|-id=461 bgcolor=#E9E9E9
| 340461 ||  || — || April 19, 2006 || Palomar || NEAT || — || align=right | 1.6 km || 
|-id=462 bgcolor=#E9E9E9
| 340462 ||  || — || April 19, 2006 || Mount Lemmon || Mount Lemmon Survey || — || align=right | 1.7 km || 
|-id=463 bgcolor=#E9E9E9
| 340463 ||  || — || April 18, 2006 || Kitt Peak || Spacewatch || — || align=right | 1.8 km || 
|-id=464 bgcolor=#E9E9E9
| 340464 ||  || — || April 20, 2006 || Kitt Peak || Spacewatch || — || align=right | 1.3 km || 
|-id=465 bgcolor=#d6d6d6
| 340465 ||  || — || April 20, 2006 || Kitt Peak || Spacewatch || IMH || align=right | 2.7 km || 
|-id=466 bgcolor=#fefefe
| 340466 ||  || — || April 20, 2006 || Kitt Peak || Spacewatch || H || align=right data-sort-value="0.95" | 950 m || 
|-id=467 bgcolor=#fefefe
| 340467 ||  || — || April 23, 2006 || Socorro || LINEAR || H || align=right data-sort-value="0.72" | 720 m || 
|-id=468 bgcolor=#E9E9E9
| 340468 ||  || — || April 18, 2006 || Catalina || CSS || INO || align=right | 2.2 km || 
|-id=469 bgcolor=#E9E9E9
| 340469 ||  || — || April 19, 2006 || Mount Lemmon || Mount Lemmon Survey || — || align=right | 1.8 km || 
|-id=470 bgcolor=#E9E9E9
| 340470 ||  || — || April 19, 2006 || Mount Lemmon || Mount Lemmon Survey || GEF || align=right | 1.8 km || 
|-id=471 bgcolor=#E9E9E9
| 340471 ||  || — || April 20, 2006 || Catalina || CSS || — || align=right | 2.5 km || 
|-id=472 bgcolor=#E9E9E9
| 340472 ||  || — || April 24, 2006 || Mount Lemmon || Mount Lemmon Survey || — || align=right | 2.8 km || 
|-id=473 bgcolor=#E9E9E9
| 340473 ||  || — || April 25, 2006 || Kitt Peak || Spacewatch || ADE || align=right | 3.0 km || 
|-id=474 bgcolor=#E9E9E9
| 340474 ||  || — || April 20, 2006 || Kitt Peak || Spacewatch || — || align=right data-sort-value="0.97" | 970 m || 
|-id=475 bgcolor=#E9E9E9
| 340475 ||  || — || April 24, 2006 || Kitt Peak || Spacewatch || — || align=right | 1.4 km || 
|-id=476 bgcolor=#E9E9E9
| 340476 ||  || — || April 24, 2006 || Kitt Peak || Spacewatch || — || align=right | 1.8 km || 
|-id=477 bgcolor=#E9E9E9
| 340477 ||  || — || April 19, 2006 || Catalina || CSS || — || align=right | 3.1 km || 
|-id=478 bgcolor=#E9E9E9
| 340478 ||  || — || April 23, 2006 || Socorro || LINEAR || — || align=right | 1.6 km || 
|-id=479 bgcolor=#E9E9E9
| 340479 Broca ||  ||  || April 28, 2006 || Saint-Sulpice || B. Christophe || MAR || align=right | 1.6 km || 
|-id=480 bgcolor=#E9E9E9
| 340480 ||  || — || April 24, 2006 || Kitt Peak || Spacewatch || — || align=right | 2.0 km || 
|-id=481 bgcolor=#E9E9E9
| 340481 ||  || — || April 24, 2006 || Mount Lemmon || Mount Lemmon Survey || — || align=right | 1.5 km || 
|-id=482 bgcolor=#E9E9E9
| 340482 ||  || — || April 24, 2006 || Mount Lemmon || Mount Lemmon Survey || — || align=right | 1.6 km || 
|-id=483 bgcolor=#E9E9E9
| 340483 ||  || — || April 25, 2006 || Kitt Peak || Spacewatch || AGN || align=right | 1.2 km || 
|-id=484 bgcolor=#d6d6d6
| 340484 ||  || — || April 25, 2006 || Kitt Peak || Spacewatch || — || align=right | 2.8 km || 
|-id=485 bgcolor=#E9E9E9
| 340485 ||  || — || April 26, 2006 || Mount Lemmon || Mount Lemmon Survey || — || align=right | 2.2 km || 
|-id=486 bgcolor=#E9E9E9
| 340486 ||  || — || April 26, 2006 || Kitt Peak || Spacewatch || — || align=right | 2.5 km || 
|-id=487 bgcolor=#E9E9E9
| 340487 ||  || — || April 26, 2006 || Kitt Peak || Spacewatch || — || align=right | 2.9 km || 
|-id=488 bgcolor=#E9E9E9
| 340488 ||  || — || April 26, 2006 || Kitt Peak || Spacewatch || — || align=right | 2.5 km || 
|-id=489 bgcolor=#E9E9E9
| 340489 ||  || — || April 27, 2006 || Kitt Peak || Spacewatch || ADE || align=right | 2.3 km || 
|-id=490 bgcolor=#E9E9E9
| 340490 ||  || — || April 30, 2006 || Kitt Peak || Spacewatch || — || align=right | 1.8 km || 
|-id=491 bgcolor=#d6d6d6
| 340491 ||  || — || April 29, 2006 || Kitt Peak || Spacewatch || — || align=right | 3.0 km || 
|-id=492 bgcolor=#d6d6d6
| 340492 ||  || — || April 30, 2006 || Kitt Peak || Spacewatch || LAU || align=right | 1.1 km || 
|-id=493 bgcolor=#E9E9E9
| 340493 ||  || — || April 30, 2006 || Kitt Peak || Spacewatch || — || align=right | 2.8 km || 
|-id=494 bgcolor=#E9E9E9
| 340494 ||  || — || April 30, 2006 || Kitt Peak || Spacewatch || HEN || align=right | 1.1 km || 
|-id=495 bgcolor=#E9E9E9
| 340495 ||  || — || April 30, 2006 || Kitt Peak || Spacewatch || — || align=right | 2.5 km || 
|-id=496 bgcolor=#E9E9E9
| 340496 ||  || — || April 30, 2006 || Kitt Peak || Spacewatch || — || align=right | 2.7 km || 
|-id=497 bgcolor=#E9E9E9
| 340497 ||  || — || April 30, 2006 || Kitt Peak || Spacewatch || — || align=right | 1.6 km || 
|-id=498 bgcolor=#E9E9E9
| 340498 ||  || — || April 26, 2006 || Kitt Peak || Spacewatch || WIT || align=right | 1.2 km || 
|-id=499 bgcolor=#E9E9E9
| 340499 ||  || — || April 26, 2006 || Kitt Peak || Spacewatch || — || align=right | 2.5 km || 
|-id=500 bgcolor=#E9E9E9
| 340500 ||  || — || April 26, 2006 || Kitt Peak || Spacewatch || — || align=right | 3.4 km || 
|}

340501–340600 

|-bgcolor=#E9E9E9
| 340501 ||  || — || April 30, 2006 || Kitt Peak || Spacewatch || — || align=right | 2.3 km || 
|-id=502 bgcolor=#E9E9E9
| 340502 ||  || — || April 30, 2006 || Kitt Peak || Spacewatch || — || align=right | 2.2 km || 
|-id=503 bgcolor=#E9E9E9
| 340503 ||  || — || April 26, 2006 || Kitt Peak || Spacewatch || — || align=right | 1.2 km || 
|-id=504 bgcolor=#E9E9E9
| 340504 ||  || — || April 26, 2006 || Kitt Peak || Spacewatch || RAF || align=right | 1.1 km || 
|-id=505 bgcolor=#E9E9E9
| 340505 ||  || — || April 20, 2006 || Kitt Peak || Spacewatch || — || align=right | 2.1 km || 
|-id=506 bgcolor=#E9E9E9
| 340506 ||  || — || April 20, 2006 || Kitt Peak || Spacewatch || — || align=right | 1.4 km || 
|-id=507 bgcolor=#E9E9E9
| 340507 ||  || — || May 1, 2006 || Kitt Peak || Spacewatch || AGN || align=right | 1.4 km || 
|-id=508 bgcolor=#E9E9E9
| 340508 ||  || — || May 1, 2006 || Kitt Peak || Spacewatch || — || align=right | 2.6 km || 
|-id=509 bgcolor=#E9E9E9
| 340509 ||  || — || May 1, 2006 || Kitt Peak || Spacewatch || — || align=right | 2.0 km || 
|-id=510 bgcolor=#E9E9E9
| 340510 ||  || — || May 1, 2006 || Kitt Peak || Spacewatch || — || align=right | 3.4 km || 
|-id=511 bgcolor=#E9E9E9
| 340511 ||  || — || May 1, 2006 || Kitt Peak || Spacewatch || — || align=right | 1.7 km || 
|-id=512 bgcolor=#E9E9E9
| 340512 ||  || — || May 3, 2006 || Kitt Peak || Spacewatch || GEF || align=right | 1.7 km || 
|-id=513 bgcolor=#E9E9E9
| 340513 ||  || — || May 2, 2006 || Mount Lemmon || Mount Lemmon Survey || MIS || align=right | 3.9 km || 
|-id=514 bgcolor=#E9E9E9
| 340514 ||  || — || May 2, 2006 || Mount Lemmon || Mount Lemmon Survey || HEN || align=right | 1.4 km || 
|-id=515 bgcolor=#E9E9E9
| 340515 ||  || — || May 2, 2006 || Kitt Peak || Spacewatch || — || align=right | 1.7 km || 
|-id=516 bgcolor=#E9E9E9
| 340516 ||  || — || May 2, 2006 || Kitt Peak || Spacewatch || ADE || align=right | 2.6 km || 
|-id=517 bgcolor=#d6d6d6
| 340517 ||  || — || May 3, 2006 || Mount Lemmon || Mount Lemmon Survey || — || align=right | 1.7 km || 
|-id=518 bgcolor=#fefefe
| 340518 ||  || — || February 6, 2006 || Kitt Peak || Spacewatch || H || align=right data-sort-value="0.92" | 920 m || 
|-id=519 bgcolor=#E9E9E9
| 340519 ||  || — || May 3, 2006 || Reedy Creek || J. Broughton || GEF || align=right | 1.9 km || 
|-id=520 bgcolor=#E9E9E9
| 340520 ||  || — || May 2, 2006 || Mount Lemmon || Mount Lemmon Survey || AGN || align=right | 1.2 km || 
|-id=521 bgcolor=#E9E9E9
| 340521 ||  || — || May 3, 2006 || Kitt Peak || Spacewatch || HNS || align=right | 1.1 km || 
|-id=522 bgcolor=#E9E9E9
| 340522 ||  || — || May 4, 2006 || Kitt Peak || Spacewatch || — || align=right | 3.0 km || 
|-id=523 bgcolor=#E9E9E9
| 340523 ||  || — || May 4, 2006 || Mount Lemmon || Mount Lemmon Survey || NEM || align=right | 2.3 km || 
|-id=524 bgcolor=#E9E9E9
| 340524 ||  || — || May 4, 2006 || Kitt Peak || Spacewatch || — || align=right | 2.4 km || 
|-id=525 bgcolor=#E9E9E9
| 340525 ||  || — || May 4, 2006 || Kitt Peak || Spacewatch || — || align=right | 3.4 km || 
|-id=526 bgcolor=#E9E9E9
| 340526 ||  || — || May 5, 2006 || Kitt Peak || Spacewatch || — || align=right | 1.2 km || 
|-id=527 bgcolor=#E9E9E9
| 340527 ||  || — || May 5, 2006 || Kitt Peak || Spacewatch || — || align=right | 2.4 km || 
|-id=528 bgcolor=#E9E9E9
| 340528 ||  || — || May 5, 2006 || Kitt Peak || Spacewatch || — || align=right | 1.9 km || 
|-id=529 bgcolor=#E9E9E9
| 340529 ||  || — || May 6, 2006 || Mount Lemmon || Mount Lemmon Survey || — || align=right | 1.1 km || 
|-id=530 bgcolor=#E9E9E9
| 340530 ||  || — || May 8, 2006 || Siding Spring || SSS || — || align=right | 2.1 km || 
|-id=531 bgcolor=#E9E9E9
| 340531 ||  || — || May 2, 2006 || Mount Lemmon || Mount Lemmon Survey || — || align=right | 1.5 km || 
|-id=532 bgcolor=#E9E9E9
| 340532 ||  || — || May 2, 2006 || Mount Lemmon || Mount Lemmon Survey || GEF || align=right | 1.6 km || 
|-id=533 bgcolor=#E9E9E9
| 340533 ||  || — || May 2, 2006 || Kitt Peak || Spacewatch || ADE || align=right | 2.2 km || 
|-id=534 bgcolor=#E9E9E9
| 340534 ||  || — || May 3, 2006 || Kitt Peak || Spacewatch || — || align=right | 1.1 km || 
|-id=535 bgcolor=#E9E9E9
| 340535 ||  || — || May 7, 2006 || Mount Lemmon || Mount Lemmon Survey || — || align=right | 2.2 km || 
|-id=536 bgcolor=#E9E9E9
| 340536 ||  || — || May 7, 2006 || Mount Lemmon || Mount Lemmon Survey || — || align=right | 2.6 km || 
|-id=537 bgcolor=#E9E9E9
| 340537 ||  || — || May 8, 2006 || Siding Spring || SSS || HNS || align=right | 4.3 km || 
|-id=538 bgcolor=#E9E9E9
| 340538 ||  || — || May 1, 2006 || Mauna Kea || P. A. Wiegert || — || align=right | 2.4 km || 
|-id=539 bgcolor=#d6d6d6
| 340539 ||  || — || May 7, 2006 || Mount Lemmon || Mount Lemmon Survey || — || align=right | 2.2 km || 
|-id=540 bgcolor=#E9E9E9
| 340540 ||  || — || May 19, 2006 || Mount Lemmon || Mount Lemmon Survey || — || align=right | 2.6 km || 
|-id=541 bgcolor=#E9E9E9
| 340541 ||  || — || May 19, 2006 || Mount Lemmon || Mount Lemmon Survey || WIT || align=right | 1.1 km || 
|-id=542 bgcolor=#E9E9E9
| 340542 ||  || — || May 19, 2006 || Mount Lemmon || Mount Lemmon Survey || PAD || align=right | 2.9 km || 
|-id=543 bgcolor=#E9E9E9
| 340543 ||  || — || May 20, 2006 || Catalina || CSS || RAF || align=right | 1.6 km || 
|-id=544 bgcolor=#fefefe
| 340544 ||  || — || May 20, 2006 || Palomar || NEAT || H || align=right data-sort-value="0.79" | 790 m || 
|-id=545 bgcolor=#E9E9E9
| 340545 ||  || — || May 21, 2006 || Kitt Peak || Spacewatch || ADE || align=right | 3.4 km || 
|-id=546 bgcolor=#E9E9E9
| 340546 ||  || — || May 20, 2006 || Catalina || CSS || — || align=right | 3.7 km || 
|-id=547 bgcolor=#E9E9E9
| 340547 ||  || — || May 20, 2006 || Kitt Peak || Spacewatch || — || align=right | 2.4 km || 
|-id=548 bgcolor=#E9E9E9
| 340548 ||  || — || May 20, 2006 || Kitt Peak || Spacewatch || — || align=right | 1.5 km || 
|-id=549 bgcolor=#E9E9E9
| 340549 ||  || — || May 20, 2006 || Kitt Peak || Spacewatch || — || align=right | 1.3 km || 
|-id=550 bgcolor=#E9E9E9
| 340550 ||  || — || May 20, 2006 || Kitt Peak || Spacewatch || — || align=right | 1.5 km || 
|-id=551 bgcolor=#E9E9E9
| 340551 ||  || — || May 21, 2006 || Kitt Peak || Spacewatch || — || align=right | 2.8 km || 
|-id=552 bgcolor=#E9E9E9
| 340552 ||  || — || May 21, 2006 || Kitt Peak || Spacewatch || MRX || align=right | 1.4 km || 
|-id=553 bgcolor=#d6d6d6
| 340553 ||  || — || April 26, 2006 || Kitt Peak || Spacewatch || — || align=right | 2.6 km || 
|-id=554 bgcolor=#d6d6d6
| 340554 ||  || — || May 6, 2006 || Mount Lemmon || Mount Lemmon Survey || — || align=right | 2.4 km || 
|-id=555 bgcolor=#E9E9E9
| 340555 ||  || — || May 21, 2006 || Kitt Peak || Spacewatch || — || align=right | 2.3 km || 
|-id=556 bgcolor=#E9E9E9
| 340556 ||  || — || May 23, 2006 || Mount Lemmon || Mount Lemmon Survey || — || align=right | 2.4 km || 
|-id=557 bgcolor=#E9E9E9
| 340557 ||  || — || May 23, 2006 || Kitt Peak || Spacewatch || — || align=right | 2.1 km || 
|-id=558 bgcolor=#E9E9E9
| 340558 ||  || — || May 24, 2006 || Mount Lemmon || Mount Lemmon Survey || — || align=right | 1.7 km || 
|-id=559 bgcolor=#E9E9E9
| 340559 ||  || — || May 24, 2006 || Mount Lemmon || Mount Lemmon Survey || — || align=right | 1.9 km || 
|-id=560 bgcolor=#E9E9E9
| 340560 ||  || — || May 24, 2006 || Mount Lemmon || Mount Lemmon Survey || WIT || align=right data-sort-value="0.90" | 900 m || 
|-id=561 bgcolor=#E9E9E9
| 340561 ||  || — || May 24, 2006 || Mount Lemmon || Mount Lemmon Survey || — || align=right | 2.1 km || 
|-id=562 bgcolor=#E9E9E9
| 340562 ||  || — || May 25, 2006 || Mount Lemmon || Mount Lemmon Survey || — || align=right | 3.1 km || 
|-id=563 bgcolor=#E9E9E9
| 340563 ||  || — || May 25, 2006 || Kitt Peak || Spacewatch || — || align=right | 2.4 km || 
|-id=564 bgcolor=#E9E9E9
| 340564 ||  || — || May 25, 2006 || Mount Lemmon || Mount Lemmon Survey || GEF || align=right | 1.6 km || 
|-id=565 bgcolor=#d6d6d6
| 340565 ||  || — || May 25, 2006 || Kitt Peak || Spacewatch || EUP || align=right | 4.3 km || 
|-id=566 bgcolor=#E9E9E9
| 340566 ||  || — || May 29, 2006 || Siding Spring || SSS || INO || align=right | 1.6 km || 
|-id=567 bgcolor=#E9E9E9
| 340567 ||  || — || May 28, 2006 || Kitt Peak || Spacewatch || — || align=right | 1.8 km || 
|-id=568 bgcolor=#d6d6d6
| 340568 ||  || — || May 31, 2006 || Mount Lemmon || Mount Lemmon Survey || — || align=right | 2.5 km || 
|-id=569 bgcolor=#E9E9E9
| 340569 ||  || — || May 29, 2006 || Kitt Peak || Spacewatch || — || align=right | 2.4 km || 
|-id=570 bgcolor=#E9E9E9
| 340570 ||  || — || May 29, 2006 || Kitt Peak || Spacewatch || EUN || align=right | 1.9 km || 
|-id=571 bgcolor=#d6d6d6
| 340571 ||  || — || May 24, 2006 || Mount Lemmon || Mount Lemmon Survey || — || align=right | 3.3 km || 
|-id=572 bgcolor=#d6d6d6
| 340572 ||  || — || May 25, 2006 || Kitt Peak || Spacewatch || — || align=right | 3.9 km || 
|-id=573 bgcolor=#E9E9E9
| 340573 ||  || — || June 19, 2006 || Kitt Peak || Spacewatch || HNS || align=right | 1.8 km || 
|-id=574 bgcolor=#d6d6d6
| 340574 ||  || — || June 21, 2006 || Lulin Observatory || Q.-z. Ye || — || align=right | 3.2 km || 
|-id=575 bgcolor=#d6d6d6
| 340575 ||  || — || June 29, 2006 || Hibiscus || S. F. Hönig || EUP || align=right | 4.2 km || 
|-id=576 bgcolor=#d6d6d6
| 340576 ||  || — || July 21, 2006 || Palomar || NEAT || — || align=right | 4.1 km || 
|-id=577 bgcolor=#d6d6d6
| 340577 ||  || — || July 18, 2006 || Siding Spring || SSS || — || align=right | 4.0 km || 
|-id=578 bgcolor=#d6d6d6
| 340578 ||  || — || July 21, 2006 || Catalina || CSS || EUP || align=right | 5.5 km || 
|-id=579 bgcolor=#d6d6d6
| 340579 Losse ||  ||  || August 6, 2006 || Dax || Dax Obs. || — || align=right | 4.7 km || 
|-id=580 bgcolor=#d6d6d6
| 340580 ||  || — || August 12, 2006 || Palomar || NEAT || EUP || align=right | 6.5 km || 
|-id=581 bgcolor=#d6d6d6
| 340581 ||  || — || August 12, 2006 || Palomar || NEAT || LIX || align=right | 4.5 km || 
|-id=582 bgcolor=#d6d6d6
| 340582 ||  || — || August 12, 2006 || Palomar || NEAT || EOS || align=right | 2.7 km || 
|-id=583 bgcolor=#d6d6d6
| 340583 ||  || — || August 13, 2006 || Palomar || NEAT || EOS || align=right | 2.4 km || 
|-id=584 bgcolor=#d6d6d6
| 340584 ||  || — || August 13, 2006 || Palomar || NEAT || — || align=right | 3.7 km || 
|-id=585 bgcolor=#d6d6d6
| 340585 ||  || — || August 15, 2006 || Palomar || NEAT || TIR || align=right | 4.0 km || 
|-id=586 bgcolor=#d6d6d6
| 340586 ||  || — || August 14, 2006 || Siding Spring || SSS || EUP || align=right | 5.1 km || 
|-id=587 bgcolor=#d6d6d6
| 340587 ||  || — || August 15, 2006 || Palomar || NEAT || HYG || align=right | 3.6 km || 
|-id=588 bgcolor=#d6d6d6
| 340588 ||  || — || August 12, 2006 || Palomar || NEAT || — || align=right | 3.2 km || 
|-id=589 bgcolor=#d6d6d6
| 340589 ||  || — || August 10, 2006 || Palomar || NEAT || TIR || align=right | 5.0 km || 
|-id=590 bgcolor=#d6d6d6
| 340590 ||  || — || August 15, 2006 || Siding Spring || SSS || TIR || align=right | 4.1 km || 
|-id=591 bgcolor=#d6d6d6
| 340591 ||  || — || August 12, 2006 || Palomar || NEAT || — || align=right | 4.1 km || 
|-id=592 bgcolor=#d6d6d6
| 340592 ||  || — || August 13, 2006 || Palomar || NEAT || — || align=right | 3.8 km || 
|-id=593 bgcolor=#d6d6d6
| 340593 ||  || — || August 14, 2006 || Palomar || NEAT || — || align=right | 3.7 km || 
|-id=594 bgcolor=#d6d6d6
| 340594 ||  || — || August 16, 2006 || Siding Spring || SSS || ALA || align=right | 3.7 km || 
|-id=595 bgcolor=#d6d6d6
| 340595 ||  || — || August 17, 2006 || Palomar || NEAT || HYG || align=right | 3.5 km || 
|-id=596 bgcolor=#d6d6d6
| 340596 ||  || — || August 17, 2006 || Palomar || NEAT || EOS || align=right | 2.4 km || 
|-id=597 bgcolor=#d6d6d6
| 340597 ||  || — || August 19, 2006 || Anderson Mesa || LONEOS || — || align=right | 3.7 km || 
|-id=598 bgcolor=#d6d6d6
| 340598 ||  || — || August 19, 2006 || Anderson Mesa || LONEOS || — || align=right | 4.1 km || 
|-id=599 bgcolor=#d6d6d6
| 340599 ||  || — || August 19, 2006 || Palomar || NEAT || — || align=right | 4.9 km || 
|-id=600 bgcolor=#d6d6d6
| 340600 ||  || — || July 21, 2006 || Catalina || CSS || THB || align=right | 3.4 km || 
|}

340601–340700 

|-bgcolor=#d6d6d6
| 340601 ||  || — || August 20, 2006 || Siding Spring || SSS || EUP || align=right | 5.1 km || 
|-id=602 bgcolor=#d6d6d6
| 340602 ||  || — || August 19, 2006 || Kitt Peak || Spacewatch || — || align=right | 3.0 km || 
|-id=603 bgcolor=#d6d6d6
| 340603 ||  || — || August 19, 2006 || Palomar || NEAT || LIX || align=right | 4.6 km || 
|-id=604 bgcolor=#d6d6d6
| 340604 ||  || — || August 19, 2006 || Kitt Peak || Spacewatch || URS || align=right | 3.5 km || 
|-id=605 bgcolor=#d6d6d6
| 340605 ||  || — || August 21, 2006 || Socorro || LINEAR || — || align=right | 5.0 km || 
|-id=606 bgcolor=#d6d6d6
| 340606 ||  || — || August 23, 2006 || Palomar || NEAT || — || align=right | 3.1 km || 
|-id=607 bgcolor=#d6d6d6
| 340607 ||  || — || August 17, 2006 || Palomar || NEAT || — || align=right | 3.9 km || 
|-id=608 bgcolor=#d6d6d6
| 340608 ||  || — || August 19, 2006 || Anderson Mesa || LONEOS || MEL || align=right | 5.0 km || 
|-id=609 bgcolor=#d6d6d6
| 340609 ||  || — || August 19, 2006 || Anderson Mesa || LONEOS || TIR || align=right | 5.7 km || 
|-id=610 bgcolor=#d6d6d6
| 340610 ||  || — || August 19, 2006 || Anderson Mesa || LONEOS || — || align=right | 3.9 km || 
|-id=611 bgcolor=#d6d6d6
| 340611 ||  || — || August 22, 2006 || Palomar || NEAT || — || align=right | 4.5 km || 
|-id=612 bgcolor=#d6d6d6
| 340612 ||  || — || August 24, 2006 || Palomar || NEAT || — || align=right | 3.5 km || 
|-id=613 bgcolor=#d6d6d6
| 340613 ||  || — || August 27, 2006 || Kitt Peak || Spacewatch || — || align=right | 3.5 km || 
|-id=614 bgcolor=#d6d6d6
| 340614 ||  || — || August 21, 2006 || Socorro || LINEAR || — || align=right | 4.8 km || 
|-id=615 bgcolor=#d6d6d6
| 340615 ||  || — || August 21, 2006 || Kitt Peak || Spacewatch || THM || align=right | 2.6 km || 
|-id=616 bgcolor=#d6d6d6
| 340616 ||  || — || August 27, 2006 || Kitt Peak || Spacewatch || — || align=right | 4.1 km || 
|-id=617 bgcolor=#d6d6d6
| 340617 ||  || — || August 16, 2006 || Palomar || NEAT || — || align=right | 3.3 km || 
|-id=618 bgcolor=#d6d6d6
| 340618 ||  || — || August 22, 2006 || Palomar || NEAT || — || align=right | 4.7 km || 
|-id=619 bgcolor=#d6d6d6
| 340619 ||  || — || August 24, 2006 || Palomar || NEAT || EUP || align=right | 6.8 km || 
|-id=620 bgcolor=#d6d6d6
| 340620 ||  || — || August 27, 2006 || Kitt Peak || Spacewatch || EOS || align=right | 2.2 km || 
|-id=621 bgcolor=#d6d6d6
| 340621 ||  || — || August 28, 2006 || Catalina || CSS || — || align=right | 4.0 km || 
|-id=622 bgcolor=#d6d6d6
| 340622 ||  || — || August 27, 2006 || Anderson Mesa || LONEOS || — || align=right | 3.9 km || 
|-id=623 bgcolor=#d6d6d6
| 340623 ||  || — || August 27, 2006 || Anderson Mesa || LONEOS || — || align=right | 4.1 km || 
|-id=624 bgcolor=#d6d6d6
| 340624 ||  || — || August 27, 2006 || Anderson Mesa || LONEOS || LUT || align=right | 8.1 km || 
|-id=625 bgcolor=#d6d6d6
| 340625 ||  || — || August 29, 2006 || Catalina || CSS || VER || align=right | 3.9 km || 
|-id=626 bgcolor=#d6d6d6
| 340626 ||  || — || August 29, 2006 || Catalina || CSS || THB || align=right | 4.2 km || 
|-id=627 bgcolor=#d6d6d6
| 340627 ||  || — || August 29, 2006 || Catalina || CSS || TIR || align=right | 3.8 km || 
|-id=628 bgcolor=#d6d6d6
| 340628 ||  || — || August 16, 2006 || Palomar || NEAT || — || align=right | 2.9 km || 
|-id=629 bgcolor=#d6d6d6
| 340629 ||  || — || August 16, 2006 || Palomar || NEAT || EOS || align=right | 2.4 km || 
|-id=630 bgcolor=#d6d6d6
| 340630 ||  || — || August 16, 2006 || Palomar || NEAT || EUP || align=right | 5.9 km || 
|-id=631 bgcolor=#d6d6d6
| 340631 ||  || — || August 17, 2006 || Palomar || NEAT || — || align=right | 3.2 km || 
|-id=632 bgcolor=#d6d6d6
| 340632 ||  || — || August 17, 2006 || Palomar || NEAT || TIR || align=right | 4.3 km || 
|-id=633 bgcolor=#d6d6d6
| 340633 ||  || — || August 25, 2006 || Socorro || LINEAR || — || align=right | 4.6 km || 
|-id=634 bgcolor=#d6d6d6
| 340634 ||  || — || August 27, 2006 || Anderson Mesa || LONEOS || — || align=right | 4.1 km || 
|-id=635 bgcolor=#d6d6d6
| 340635 ||  || — || August 17, 2006 || Palomar || NEAT || EUP || align=right | 4.9 km || 
|-id=636 bgcolor=#d6d6d6
| 340636 ||  || — || August 18, 2006 || Kitt Peak || Spacewatch || EOS || align=right | 2.7 km || 
|-id=637 bgcolor=#d6d6d6
| 340637 ||  || — || August 18, 2006 || Palomar || NEAT || — || align=right | 3.4 km || 
|-id=638 bgcolor=#d6d6d6
| 340638 ||  || — || August 18, 2006 || Palomar || NEAT || HYG || align=right | 2.9 km || 
|-id=639 bgcolor=#d6d6d6
| 340639 ||  || — || August 19, 2006 || Kitt Peak || Spacewatch || HYG || align=right | 3.3 km || 
|-id=640 bgcolor=#d6d6d6
| 340640 ||  || — || August 19, 2006 || Kitt Peak || Spacewatch || — || align=right | 3.7 km || 
|-id=641 bgcolor=#d6d6d6
| 340641 ||  || — || August 19, 2006 || Kitt Peak || Spacewatch || — || align=right | 2.8 km || 
|-id=642 bgcolor=#d6d6d6
| 340642 ||  || — || August 21, 2006 || Kitt Peak || Spacewatch || LIX || align=right | 5.2 km || 
|-id=643 bgcolor=#d6d6d6
| 340643 ||  || — || August 29, 2006 || Catalina || CSS || — || align=right | 3.5 km || 
|-id=644 bgcolor=#d6d6d6
| 340644 ||  || — || August 29, 2006 || Catalina || CSS || — || align=right | 3.3 km || 
|-id=645 bgcolor=#d6d6d6
| 340645 ||  || — || August 30, 2006 || Anderson Mesa || LONEOS || — || align=right | 5.1 km || 
|-id=646 bgcolor=#d6d6d6
| 340646 ||  || — || August 31, 2006 || Socorro || LINEAR || Tj (2.98) || align=right | 5.2 km || 
|-id=647 bgcolor=#d6d6d6
| 340647 ||  || — || August 22, 2006 || Cerro Tololo || M. W. Buie || — || align=right | 2.4 km || 
|-id=648 bgcolor=#d6d6d6
| 340648 ||  || — || August 21, 2006 || Kitt Peak || Spacewatch || — || align=right | 3.3 km || 
|-id=649 bgcolor=#d6d6d6
| 340649 ||  || — || August 28, 2006 || Kitt Peak || Spacewatch || — || align=right | 2.7 km || 
|-id=650 bgcolor=#d6d6d6
| 340650 ||  || — || August 19, 2006 || Kitt Peak || Spacewatch || — || align=right | 4.7 km || 
|-id=651 bgcolor=#d6d6d6
| 340651 ||  || — || September 12, 2006 || Mayhill || A. Lowe || — || align=right | 4.4 km || 
|-id=652 bgcolor=#d6d6d6
| 340652 ||  || — || September 14, 2006 || Catalina || CSS || — || align=right | 5.9 km || 
|-id=653 bgcolor=#d6d6d6
| 340653 ||  || — || September 11, 2006 || Catalina || CSS || — || align=right | 5.0 km || 
|-id=654 bgcolor=#d6d6d6
| 340654 ||  || — || September 13, 2006 || Palomar || NEAT || THM || align=right | 2.9 km || 
|-id=655 bgcolor=#d6d6d6
| 340655 ||  || — || September 13, 2006 || Palomar || NEAT || TIR || align=right | 4.3 km || 
|-id=656 bgcolor=#d6d6d6
| 340656 ||  || — || September 14, 2006 || Kitt Peak || Spacewatch || — || align=right | 2.8 km || 
|-id=657 bgcolor=#d6d6d6
| 340657 ||  || — || September 14, 2006 || Catalina || CSS || — || align=right | 6.5 km || 
|-id=658 bgcolor=#d6d6d6
| 340658 ||  || — || September 14, 2006 || Palomar || NEAT || EUP || align=right | 4.5 km || 
|-id=659 bgcolor=#d6d6d6
| 340659 ||  || — || September 14, 2006 || Catalina || CSS || — || align=right | 3.7 km || 
|-id=660 bgcolor=#d6d6d6
| 340660 ||  || — || September 14, 2006 || Kitt Peak || Spacewatch || VER || align=right | 2.5 km || 
|-id=661 bgcolor=#d6d6d6
| 340661 ||  || — || September 14, 2006 || Palomar || NEAT || EUP || align=right | 5.1 km || 
|-id=662 bgcolor=#d6d6d6
| 340662 ||  || — || September 15, 2006 || Kitt Peak || Spacewatch || — || align=right | 2.6 km || 
|-id=663 bgcolor=#d6d6d6
| 340663 ||  || — || September 15, 2006 || Kitt Peak || Spacewatch || URS || align=right | 3.4 km || 
|-id=664 bgcolor=#d6d6d6
| 340664 ||  || — || September 15, 2006 || Kitt Peak || Spacewatch || — || align=right | 2.9 km || 
|-id=665 bgcolor=#d6d6d6
| 340665 ||  || — || September 14, 2006 || Palomar || NEAT || — || align=right | 4.0 km || 
|-id=666 bgcolor=#FFC2E0
| 340666 ||  || — || September 15, 2006 || Socorro || LINEAR || ATE +1km || align=right data-sort-value="0.97" | 970 m || 
|-id=667 bgcolor=#d6d6d6
| 340667 ||  || — || September 12, 2006 || Catalina || CSS || — || align=right | 4.4 km || 
|-id=668 bgcolor=#d6d6d6
| 340668 ||  || — || September 12, 2006 || Catalina || CSS || — || align=right | 3.6 km || 
|-id=669 bgcolor=#d6d6d6
| 340669 ||  || — || September 14, 2006 || Catalina || CSS || — || align=right | 4.5 km || 
|-id=670 bgcolor=#d6d6d6
| 340670 ||  || — || September 14, 2006 || Catalina || CSS || — || align=right | 3.8 km || 
|-id=671 bgcolor=#d6d6d6
| 340671 ||  || — || September 14, 2006 || Kitt Peak || Spacewatch || — || align=right | 2.8 km || 
|-id=672 bgcolor=#d6d6d6
| 340672 ||  || — || September 14, 2006 || Kitt Peak || Spacewatch || HYG || align=right | 3.5 km || 
|-id=673 bgcolor=#d6d6d6
| 340673 ||  || — || September 14, 2006 || Kitt Peak || Spacewatch || — || align=right | 3.5 km || 
|-id=674 bgcolor=#d6d6d6
| 340674 ||  || — || September 14, 2006 || Kitt Peak || Spacewatch || — || align=right | 3.2 km || 
|-id=675 bgcolor=#d6d6d6
| 340675 ||  || — || September 14, 2006 || Kitt Peak || Spacewatch || — || align=right | 5.6 km || 
|-id=676 bgcolor=#d6d6d6
| 340676 ||  || — || September 15, 2006 || Kitt Peak || Spacewatch || — || align=right | 3.2 km || 
|-id=677 bgcolor=#d6d6d6
| 340677 ||  || — || September 14, 2006 || Palomar || NEAT || — || align=right | 3.4 km || 
|-id=678 bgcolor=#d6d6d6
| 340678 ||  || — || September 15, 2006 || Kitt Peak || Spacewatch || — || align=right | 3.0 km || 
|-id=679 bgcolor=#d6d6d6
| 340679 ||  || — || September 15, 2006 || Kitt Peak || Spacewatch || — || align=right | 3.7 km || 
|-id=680 bgcolor=#d6d6d6
| 340680 ||  || — || September 15, 2006 || Kitt Peak || Spacewatch || — || align=right | 3.3 km || 
|-id=681 bgcolor=#d6d6d6
| 340681 ||  || — || September 15, 2006 || Kitt Peak || Spacewatch || — || align=right | 4.1 km || 
|-id=682 bgcolor=#d6d6d6
| 340682 ||  || — || September 15, 2006 || Kitt Peak || Spacewatch || — || align=right | 3.1 km || 
|-id=683 bgcolor=#fefefe
| 340683 ||  || — || September 15, 2006 || Kitt Peak || Spacewatch || NYS || align=right data-sort-value="0.65" | 650 m || 
|-id=684 bgcolor=#d6d6d6
| 340684 ||  || — || September 15, 2006 || Kitt Peak || Spacewatch || — || align=right | 4.0 km || 
|-id=685 bgcolor=#d6d6d6
| 340685 ||  || — || September 14, 2006 || Catalina || CSS || VER || align=right | 3.7 km || 
|-id=686 bgcolor=#d6d6d6
| 340686 ||  || — || September 14, 2006 || Palomar || NEAT || EUP || align=right | 5.9 km || 
|-id=687 bgcolor=#d6d6d6
| 340687 ||  || — || September 14, 2006 || Mauna Kea || J. Masiero || LIX || align=right | 5.2 km || 
|-id=688 bgcolor=#d6d6d6
| 340688 ||  || — || September 15, 2006 || Kitt Peak || Spacewatch || — || align=right | 3.5 km || 
|-id=689 bgcolor=#d6d6d6
| 340689 ||  || — || September 15, 2006 || Kitt Peak || Spacewatch || — || align=right | 3.1 km || 
|-id=690 bgcolor=#d6d6d6
| 340690 ||  || — || September 14, 2006 || Kitt Peak || Spacewatch || — || align=right | 2.9 km || 
|-id=691 bgcolor=#d6d6d6
| 340691 ||  || — || September 6, 2006 || Palomar || NEAT || — || align=right | 6.3 km || 
|-id=692 bgcolor=#d6d6d6
| 340692 ||  || — || September 16, 2006 || Goodricke-Pigott || R. A. Tucker || — || align=right | 4.2 km || 
|-id=693 bgcolor=#d6d6d6
| 340693 ||  || — || September 16, 2006 || Catalina || CSS || ALA || align=right | 4.2 km || 
|-id=694 bgcolor=#d6d6d6
| 340694 ||  || — || September 17, 2006 || Catalina || CSS || — || align=right | 3.7 km || 
|-id=695 bgcolor=#d6d6d6
| 340695 ||  || — || August 30, 2006 || Anderson Mesa || LONEOS || URS || align=right | 3.6 km || 
|-id=696 bgcolor=#d6d6d6
| 340696 ||  || — || September 16, 2006 || Anderson Mesa || LONEOS || EUP || align=right | 4.1 km || 
|-id=697 bgcolor=#d6d6d6
| 340697 ||  || — || September 17, 2006 || Kitt Peak || Spacewatch || VER || align=right | 2.8 km || 
|-id=698 bgcolor=#d6d6d6
| 340698 ||  || — || September 16, 2006 || Anderson Mesa || LONEOS || VER || align=right | 3.6 km || 
|-id=699 bgcolor=#d6d6d6
| 340699 ||  || — || September 16, 2006 || Palomar || NEAT || — || align=right | 4.3 km || 
|-id=700 bgcolor=#d6d6d6
| 340700 ||  || — || September 17, 2006 || Anderson Mesa || LONEOS || — || align=right | 5.2 km || 
|}

340701–340800 

|-bgcolor=#d6d6d6
| 340701 ||  || — || September 16, 2006 || Catalina || CSS || — || align=right | 3.5 km || 
|-id=702 bgcolor=#d6d6d6
| 340702 ||  || — || September 17, 2006 || Kitt Peak || Spacewatch || — || align=right | 4.3 km || 
|-id=703 bgcolor=#d6d6d6
| 340703 ||  || — || December 17, 2001 || Socorro || LINEAR || — || align=right | 3.8 km || 
|-id=704 bgcolor=#d6d6d6
| 340704 ||  || — || September 17, 2006 || Catalina || CSS || — || align=right | 4.7 km || 
|-id=705 bgcolor=#d6d6d6
| 340705 ||  || — || September 17, 2006 || Anderson Mesa || LONEOS || — || align=right | 6.2 km || 
|-id=706 bgcolor=#d6d6d6
| 340706 ||  || — || September 18, 2006 || Kitt Peak || Spacewatch || — || align=right | 4.2 km || 
|-id=707 bgcolor=#d6d6d6
| 340707 ||  || — || September 18, 2006 || Socorro || LINEAR || — || align=right | 3.9 km || 
|-id=708 bgcolor=#d6d6d6
| 340708 ||  || — || September 18, 2006 || Socorro || LINEAR || — || align=right | 4.5 km || 
|-id=709 bgcolor=#d6d6d6
| 340709 ||  || — || September 18, 2006 || Kitt Peak || Spacewatch || — || align=right | 3.1 km || 
|-id=710 bgcolor=#d6d6d6
| 340710 ||  || — || September 19, 2006 || Catalina || CSS || — || align=right | 3.5 km || 
|-id=711 bgcolor=#d6d6d6
| 340711 ||  || — || September 19, 2006 || Catalina || CSS || — || align=right | 3.3 km || 
|-id=712 bgcolor=#d6d6d6
| 340712 ||  || — || September 19, 2006 || Anderson Mesa || LONEOS || — || align=right | 3.5 km || 
|-id=713 bgcolor=#d6d6d6
| 340713 ||  || — || September 18, 2006 || Catalina || CSS || EUP || align=right | 5.2 km || 
|-id=714 bgcolor=#d6d6d6
| 340714 ||  || — || September 20, 2006 || Črni Vrh || Črni Vrh || — || align=right | 3.6 km || 
|-id=715 bgcolor=#d6d6d6
| 340715 ||  || — || September 19, 2006 || Kitt Peak || Spacewatch || — || align=right | 3.1 km || 
|-id=716 bgcolor=#d6d6d6
| 340716 ||  || — || September 18, 2006 || Calvin-Rehoboth || Calvin–Rehoboth Obs. || — || align=right | 2.6 km || 
|-id=717 bgcolor=#d6d6d6
| 340717 ||  || — || September 19, 2006 || Kitt Peak || Spacewatch || — || align=right | 3.4 km || 
|-id=718 bgcolor=#d6d6d6
| 340718 ||  || — || September 19, 2006 || Kitt Peak || Spacewatch || — || align=right | 4.6 km || 
|-id=719 bgcolor=#d6d6d6
| 340719 ||  || — || September 19, 2006 || Kitt Peak || Spacewatch || THM || align=right | 4.1 km || 
|-id=720 bgcolor=#d6d6d6
| 340720 ||  || — || September 20, 2006 || Kitt Peak || Spacewatch || — || align=right | 3.3 km || 
|-id=721 bgcolor=#d6d6d6
| 340721 ||  || — || September 18, 2006 || Kitt Peak || Spacewatch || — || align=right | 3.1 km || 
|-id=722 bgcolor=#d6d6d6
| 340722 ||  || — || September 18, 2006 || Kitt Peak || Spacewatch || — || align=right | 3.8 km || 
|-id=723 bgcolor=#d6d6d6
| 340723 ||  || — || September 23, 2006 || Kitt Peak || Spacewatch || — || align=right | 3.3 km || 
|-id=724 bgcolor=#d6d6d6
| 340724 ||  || — || September 26, 2006 || Cordell-Lorenz || Cordell–Lorenz Obs. || — || align=right | 2.7 km || 
|-id=725 bgcolor=#d6d6d6
| 340725 ||  || — || September 17, 2006 || Catalina || CSS || VER || align=right | 3.9 km || 
|-id=726 bgcolor=#d6d6d6
| 340726 ||  || — || September 20, 2006 || Catalina || CSS || LIX || align=right | 4.7 km || 
|-id=727 bgcolor=#d6d6d6
| 340727 ||  || — || September 22, 2006 || Catalina || CSS || URS || align=right | 3.8 km || 
|-id=728 bgcolor=#d6d6d6
| 340728 ||  || — || September 19, 2006 || Catalina || CSS || — || align=right | 3.4 km || 
|-id=729 bgcolor=#d6d6d6
| 340729 ||  || — || September 19, 2006 || Kitt Peak || Spacewatch || SYL7:4 || align=right | 4.3 km || 
|-id=730 bgcolor=#d6d6d6
| 340730 ||  || — || September 19, 2006 || Kitt Peak || Spacewatch || — || align=right | 4.1 km || 
|-id=731 bgcolor=#d6d6d6
| 340731 ||  || — || September 22, 2006 || San Marcello || Pistoia Mountains Obs. || — || align=right | 4.7 km || 
|-id=732 bgcolor=#d6d6d6
| 340732 ||  || — || September 24, 2006 || Kitt Peak || Spacewatch || THM || align=right | 2.8 km || 
|-id=733 bgcolor=#d6d6d6
| 340733 ||  || — || September 25, 2006 || Kitt Peak || Spacewatch || URS || align=right | 5.1 km || 
|-id=734 bgcolor=#d6d6d6
| 340734 ||  || — || September 25, 2006 || Kitt Peak || Spacewatch || — || align=right | 3.7 km || 
|-id=735 bgcolor=#d6d6d6
| 340735 ||  || — || September 25, 2006 || Kitt Peak || Spacewatch || HYG || align=right | 3.1 km || 
|-id=736 bgcolor=#d6d6d6
| 340736 ||  || — || September 25, 2006 || Kitt Peak || Spacewatch || — || align=right | 2.6 km || 
|-id=737 bgcolor=#d6d6d6
| 340737 ||  || — || September 25, 2006 || Kitt Peak || Spacewatch || 7:4 || align=right | 3.5 km || 
|-id=738 bgcolor=#d6d6d6
| 340738 ||  || — || September 26, 2006 || Mount Lemmon || Mount Lemmon Survey || — || align=right | 3.5 km || 
|-id=739 bgcolor=#d6d6d6
| 340739 ||  || — || September 26, 2006 || Kitt Peak || Spacewatch || — || align=right | 3.5 km || 
|-id=740 bgcolor=#d6d6d6
| 340740 ||  || — || September 23, 2006 || Siding Spring || SSS || TIR || align=right | 3.9 km || 
|-id=741 bgcolor=#d6d6d6
| 340741 ||  || — || September 24, 2006 || Kitt Peak || Spacewatch || HYG || align=right | 3.0 km || 
|-id=742 bgcolor=#d6d6d6
| 340742 ||  || — || September 25, 2006 || Mount Lemmon || Mount Lemmon Survey || — || align=right | 2.7 km || 
|-id=743 bgcolor=#d6d6d6
| 340743 ||  || — || September 26, 2006 || Kitt Peak || Spacewatch || TIR || align=right | 2.6 km || 
|-id=744 bgcolor=#d6d6d6
| 340744 ||  || — || September 26, 2006 || Catalina || CSS || URS || align=right | 5.4 km || 
|-id=745 bgcolor=#d6d6d6
| 340745 ||  || — || September 27, 2006 || Kitt Peak || Spacewatch || — || align=right | 4.2 km || 
|-id=746 bgcolor=#d6d6d6
| 340746 ||  || — || September 26, 2006 || Kitt Peak || Spacewatch || HYG || align=right | 2.8 km || 
|-id=747 bgcolor=#d6d6d6
| 340747 ||  || — || September 26, 2006 || Kitt Peak || Spacewatch || — || align=right | 3.2 km || 
|-id=748 bgcolor=#d6d6d6
| 340748 ||  || — || September 26, 2006 || Kitt Peak || Spacewatch || — || align=right | 2.6 km || 
|-id=749 bgcolor=#d6d6d6
| 340749 ||  || — || September 26, 2006 || Kitt Peak || Spacewatch || SYL7:4 || align=right | 3.8 km || 
|-id=750 bgcolor=#d6d6d6
| 340750 ||  || — || August 29, 2006 || Catalina || CSS || EOS || align=right | 2.3 km || 
|-id=751 bgcolor=#d6d6d6
| 340751 ||  || — || September 28, 2006 || Mount Lemmon || Mount Lemmon Survey || — || align=right | 3.5 km || 
|-id=752 bgcolor=#d6d6d6
| 340752 ||  || — || September 28, 2006 || Mount Lemmon || Mount Lemmon Survey || — || align=right | 2.9 km || 
|-id=753 bgcolor=#d6d6d6
| 340753 ||  || — || September 26, 2006 || Socorro || LINEAR || EOS || align=right | 2.6 km || 
|-id=754 bgcolor=#d6d6d6
| 340754 ||  || — || September 26, 2006 || Catalina || CSS || — || align=right | 4.2 km || 
|-id=755 bgcolor=#d6d6d6
| 340755 ||  || — || September 22, 2006 || Anderson Mesa || LONEOS || EUP || align=right | 4.6 km || 
|-id=756 bgcolor=#d6d6d6
| 340756 ||  || — || September 26, 2006 || Catalina || CSS || EUP || align=right | 5.1 km || 
|-id=757 bgcolor=#d6d6d6
| 340757 ||  || — || September 25, 2006 || Kitt Peak || Spacewatch || — || align=right | 3.1 km || 
|-id=758 bgcolor=#d6d6d6
| 340758 ||  || — || September 25, 2006 || Mount Lemmon || Mount Lemmon Survey || THM || align=right | 2.5 km || 
|-id=759 bgcolor=#d6d6d6
| 340759 ||  || — || September 26, 2006 || Catalina || CSS || — || align=right | 4.1 km || 
|-id=760 bgcolor=#d6d6d6
| 340760 ||  || — || September 27, 2006 || Kitt Peak || Spacewatch || URS || align=right | 4.1 km || 
|-id=761 bgcolor=#d6d6d6
| 340761 ||  || — || September 27, 2006 || Kitt Peak || Spacewatch || — || align=right | 4.3 km || 
|-id=762 bgcolor=#d6d6d6
| 340762 ||  || — || September 27, 2006 || Kitt Peak || Spacewatch || THB || align=right | 3.6 km || 
|-id=763 bgcolor=#d6d6d6
| 340763 ||  || — || September 27, 2006 || Kitt Peak || Spacewatch || — || align=right | 2.7 km || 
|-id=764 bgcolor=#d6d6d6
| 340764 ||  || — || September 27, 2006 || Kitt Peak || Spacewatch || — || align=right | 2.9 km || 
|-id=765 bgcolor=#d6d6d6
| 340765 ||  || — || September 27, 2006 || Catalina || CSS || Tj (2.96) || align=right | 5.4 km || 
|-id=766 bgcolor=#d6d6d6
| 340766 ||  || — || September 27, 2006 || Kitt Peak || Spacewatch || — || align=right | 2.8 km || 
|-id=767 bgcolor=#d6d6d6
| 340767 ||  || — || September 27, 2006 || Kitt Peak || Spacewatch || HYG || align=right | 2.8 km || 
|-id=768 bgcolor=#d6d6d6
| 340768 ||  || — || September 28, 2006 || Kitt Peak || Spacewatch || — || align=right | 3.4 km || 
|-id=769 bgcolor=#d6d6d6
| 340769 ||  || — || September 28, 2006 || Kitt Peak || Spacewatch || — || align=right | 3.4 km || 
|-id=770 bgcolor=#d6d6d6
| 340770 ||  || — || September 28, 2006 || Kitt Peak || Spacewatch || — || align=right | 3.3 km || 
|-id=771 bgcolor=#d6d6d6
| 340771 ||  || — || September 28, 2006 || Kitt Peak || Spacewatch || — || align=right | 3.4 km || 
|-id=772 bgcolor=#d6d6d6
| 340772 ||  || — || September 28, 2006 || Kitt Peak || Spacewatch || — || align=right | 3.6 km || 
|-id=773 bgcolor=#d6d6d6
| 340773 ||  || — || September 30, 2006 || Kitt Peak || Spacewatch || — || align=right | 3.9 km || 
|-id=774 bgcolor=#d6d6d6
| 340774 ||  || — || September 30, 2006 || Catalina || CSS || — || align=right | 4.5 km || 
|-id=775 bgcolor=#d6d6d6
| 340775 ||  || — || September 30, 2006 || Catalina || CSS || VER || align=right | 3.7 km || 
|-id=776 bgcolor=#d6d6d6
| 340776 ||  || — || September 30, 2006 || Mount Lemmon || Mount Lemmon Survey || 7:4 || align=right | 6.5 km || 
|-id=777 bgcolor=#d6d6d6
| 340777 ||  || — || September 27, 2006 || Mount Lemmon || Mount Lemmon Survey || — || align=right | 4.2 km || 
|-id=778 bgcolor=#d6d6d6
| 340778 ||  || — || September 17, 2006 || Apache Point || A. C. Becker || — || align=right | 3.4 km || 
|-id=779 bgcolor=#d6d6d6
| 340779 ||  || — || September 19, 2006 || Apache Point || A. C. Becker || HYG || align=right | 3.1 km || 
|-id=780 bgcolor=#d6d6d6
| 340780 ||  || — || September 27, 2006 || Apache Point || A. C. Becker || VER || align=right | 3.2 km || 
|-id=781 bgcolor=#d6d6d6
| 340781 ||  || — || September 28, 2006 || Apache Point || A. C. Becker || EUP || align=right | 4.8 km || 
|-id=782 bgcolor=#d6d6d6
| 340782 ||  || — || September 29, 2006 || Apache Point || A. C. Becker || — || align=right | 2.9 km || 
|-id=783 bgcolor=#d6d6d6
| 340783 ||  || — || September 29, 2006 || Apache Point || A. C. Becker || — || align=right | 3.3 km || 
|-id=784 bgcolor=#d6d6d6
| 340784 ||  || — || September 19, 2006 || Anderson Mesa || LONEOS || — || align=right | 3.8 km || 
|-id=785 bgcolor=#d6d6d6
| 340785 ||  || — || September 28, 2006 || Catalina || CSS || — || align=right | 3.1 km || 
|-id=786 bgcolor=#d6d6d6
| 340786 ||  || — || September 30, 2006 || Kitt Peak || Spacewatch || — || align=right | 2.9 km || 
|-id=787 bgcolor=#d6d6d6
| 340787 ||  || — || September 17, 2006 || Mauna Kea || J. Masiero || — || align=right | 3.7 km || 
|-id=788 bgcolor=#d6d6d6
| 340788 ||  || — || September 27, 2006 || Kitt Peak || Spacewatch || — || align=right | 3.3 km || 
|-id=789 bgcolor=#d6d6d6
| 340789 ||  || — || September 27, 2006 || Mount Lemmon || Mount Lemmon Survey || 7:4 || align=right | 4.7 km || 
|-id=790 bgcolor=#d6d6d6
| 340790 ||  || — || September 17, 2006 || Kitt Peak || Spacewatch || — || align=right | 3.6 km || 
|-id=791 bgcolor=#d6d6d6
| 340791 ||  || — || September 16, 2006 || Catalina || CSS || — || align=right | 4.1 km || 
|-id=792 bgcolor=#d6d6d6
| 340792 ||  || — || October 11, 2006 || Kitt Peak || Spacewatch || — || align=right | 4.4 km || 
|-id=793 bgcolor=#d6d6d6
| 340793 ||  || — || October 11, 2006 || Kitt Peak || Spacewatch || — || align=right | 3.4 km || 
|-id=794 bgcolor=#d6d6d6
| 340794 ||  || — || October 11, 2006 || Kitt Peak || Spacewatch || — || align=right | 3.3 km || 
|-id=795 bgcolor=#FA8072
| 340795 ||  || — || October 12, 2006 || Kitt Peak || Spacewatch || — || align=right data-sort-value="0.64" | 640 m || 
|-id=796 bgcolor=#d6d6d6
| 340796 ||  || — || October 13, 2006 || Kitt Peak || Spacewatch || 7:4 || align=right | 3.9 km || 
|-id=797 bgcolor=#d6d6d6
| 340797 ||  || — || October 11, 2006 || Kitt Peak || Spacewatch || HYG || align=right | 3.4 km || 
|-id=798 bgcolor=#d6d6d6
| 340798 ||  || — || October 11, 2006 || Palomar || NEAT || — || align=right | 5.6 km || 
|-id=799 bgcolor=#d6d6d6
| 340799 ||  || — || October 11, 2006 || Palomar || NEAT || ELF || align=right | 4.8 km || 
|-id=800 bgcolor=#d6d6d6
| 340800 ||  || — || October 11, 2006 || Palomar || NEAT || EOS || align=right | 2.3 km || 
|}

340801–340900 

|-bgcolor=#d6d6d6
| 340801 ||  || — || October 11, 2006 || Palomar || NEAT || — || align=right | 4.6 km || 
|-id=802 bgcolor=#d6d6d6
| 340802 ||  || — || October 11, 2006 || Palomar || NEAT || — || align=right | 4.9 km || 
|-id=803 bgcolor=#d6d6d6
| 340803 ||  || — || October 11, 2006 || Palomar || NEAT || — || align=right | 2.8 km || 
|-id=804 bgcolor=#d6d6d6
| 340804 ||  || — || October 12, 2006 || Palomar || NEAT || 7:4 || align=right | 5.5 km || 
|-id=805 bgcolor=#d6d6d6
| 340805 ||  || — || October 15, 2006 || Kitt Peak || Spacewatch || LUT || align=right | 5.9 km || 
|-id=806 bgcolor=#d6d6d6
| 340806 ||  || — || October 15, 2006 || Kitt Peak || Spacewatch || SYL7:4 || align=right | 4.3 km || 
|-id=807 bgcolor=#d6d6d6
| 340807 ||  || — || October 15, 2006 || Kitt Peak || Spacewatch || HYG || align=right | 3.2 km || 
|-id=808 bgcolor=#d6d6d6
| 340808 ||  || — || October 1, 2006 || Apache Point || A. C. Becker || — || align=right | 4.8 km || 
|-id=809 bgcolor=#d6d6d6
| 340809 ||  || — || October 16, 2006 || Catalina || CSS || 3:2 || align=right | 5.2 km || 
|-id=810 bgcolor=#d6d6d6
| 340810 ||  || — || October 16, 2006 || Kitt Peak || Spacewatch || — || align=right | 3.2 km || 
|-id=811 bgcolor=#d6d6d6
| 340811 ||  || — || October 17, 2006 || Mount Lemmon || Mount Lemmon Survey || 7:4 || align=right | 3.7 km || 
|-id=812 bgcolor=#d6d6d6
| 340812 ||  || — || October 16, 2006 || Kitt Peak || Spacewatch || HYG || align=right | 2.7 km || 
|-id=813 bgcolor=#d6d6d6
| 340813 ||  || — || October 16, 2006 || Mount Lemmon || Mount Lemmon Survey || — || align=right | 4.6 km || 
|-id=814 bgcolor=#d6d6d6
| 340814 ||  || — || October 16, 2006 || Kitt Peak || Spacewatch || — || align=right | 3.6 km || 
|-id=815 bgcolor=#d6d6d6
| 340815 ||  || — || October 18, 2006 || Kitt Peak || Spacewatch || EOS || align=right | 1.9 km || 
|-id=816 bgcolor=#d6d6d6
| 340816 ||  || — || November 20, 2001 || Socorro || LINEAR || VER || align=right | 3.0 km || 
|-id=817 bgcolor=#d6d6d6
| 340817 ||  || — || October 17, 2006 || Mount Lemmon || Mount Lemmon Survey || — || align=right | 3.5 km || 
|-id=818 bgcolor=#d6d6d6
| 340818 ||  || — || October 17, 2006 || Kitt Peak || Spacewatch || — || align=right | 4.6 km || 
|-id=819 bgcolor=#d6d6d6
| 340819 ||  || — || October 17, 2006 || Mount Lemmon || Mount Lemmon Survey || 7:4 || align=right | 4.4 km || 
|-id=820 bgcolor=#d6d6d6
| 340820 ||  || — || October 18, 2006 || Kitt Peak || Spacewatch || — || align=right | 3.1 km || 
|-id=821 bgcolor=#d6d6d6
| 340821 ||  || — || October 19, 2006 || Kitt Peak || Spacewatch || URS || align=right | 3.9 km || 
|-id=822 bgcolor=#d6d6d6
| 340822 ||  || — || October 19, 2006 || Kitt Peak || Spacewatch || SYL7:4 || align=right | 3.3 km || 
|-id=823 bgcolor=#d6d6d6
| 340823 ||  || — || October 19, 2006 || Palomar || NEAT || — || align=right | 3.2 km || 
|-id=824 bgcolor=#d6d6d6
| 340824 ||  || — || October 20, 2006 || Mount Lemmon || Mount Lemmon Survey || EUP || align=right | 5.7 km || 
|-id=825 bgcolor=#d6d6d6
| 340825 ||  || — || October 20, 2006 || Mount Lemmon || Mount Lemmon Survey || — || align=right | 3.6 km || 
|-id=826 bgcolor=#d6d6d6
| 340826 ||  || — || October 20, 2006 || Catalina || CSS || 7:4 || align=right | 4.4 km || 
|-id=827 bgcolor=#d6d6d6
| 340827 ||  || — || October 16, 2006 || Catalina || CSS || — || align=right | 3.5 km || 
|-id=828 bgcolor=#d6d6d6
| 340828 ||  || — || October 16, 2006 || Catalina || CSS || — || align=right | 3.7 km || 
|-id=829 bgcolor=#d6d6d6
| 340829 ||  || — || October 23, 2006 || Kitt Peak || Spacewatch || HYG || align=right | 3.5 km || 
|-id=830 bgcolor=#d6d6d6
| 340830 ||  || — || October 27, 2006 || Kitt Peak || Spacewatch || — || align=right | 3.1 km || 
|-id=831 bgcolor=#fefefe
| 340831 ||  || — || October 27, 2006 || Kitt Peak || Spacewatch || — || align=right data-sort-value="0.55" | 550 m || 
|-id=832 bgcolor=#fefefe
| 340832 ||  || — || October 28, 2006 || Mount Lemmon || Mount Lemmon Survey || — || align=right | 1.1 km || 
|-id=833 bgcolor=#fefefe
| 340833 ||  || — || October 27, 2006 || Mount Lemmon || Mount Lemmon Survey || — || align=right data-sort-value="0.63" | 630 m || 
|-id=834 bgcolor=#d6d6d6
| 340834 ||  || — || September 17, 1995 || Kitt Peak || Spacewatch || — || align=right | 3.0 km || 
|-id=835 bgcolor=#d6d6d6
| 340835 ||  || — || November 9, 2006 || Kitt Peak || Spacewatch || 7:4 || align=right | 5.2 km || 
|-id=836 bgcolor=#FA8072
| 340836 ||  || — || November 14, 2006 || Kitt Peak || Spacewatch || — || align=right data-sort-value="0.96" | 960 m || 
|-id=837 bgcolor=#fefefe
| 340837 ||  || — || November 10, 2006 || Kitt Peak || Spacewatch || — || align=right data-sort-value="0.65" | 650 m || 
|-id=838 bgcolor=#d6d6d6
| 340838 ||  || — || November 15, 2006 || Socorro || LINEAR || 7:4 || align=right | 6.0 km || 
|-id=839 bgcolor=#fefefe
| 340839 ||  || — || November 15, 2006 || Mount Lemmon || Mount Lemmon Survey || V || align=right data-sort-value="0.78" | 780 m || 
|-id=840 bgcolor=#fefefe
| 340840 ||  || — || November 16, 2006 || Socorro || LINEAR || — || align=right data-sort-value="0.87" | 870 m || 
|-id=841 bgcolor=#d6d6d6
| 340841 ||  || — || November 16, 2006 || Kitt Peak || Spacewatch || SYL7:4 || align=right | 5.7 km || 
|-id=842 bgcolor=#d6d6d6
| 340842 ||  || — || November 18, 2006 || Kitt Peak || Spacewatch || HYG || align=right | 3.2 km || 
|-id=843 bgcolor=#fefefe
| 340843 ||  || — || November 18, 2006 || Kitt Peak || Spacewatch || NYS || align=right data-sort-value="0.66" | 660 m || 
|-id=844 bgcolor=#FA8072
| 340844 ||  || — || November 19, 2006 || Kitt Peak || Spacewatch || — || align=right data-sort-value="0.56" | 560 m || 
|-id=845 bgcolor=#d6d6d6
| 340845 ||  || — || November 20, 2006 || Mount Lemmon || Mount Lemmon Survey || 3:2 || align=right | 5.5 km || 
|-id=846 bgcolor=#fefefe
| 340846 ||  || — || December 12, 2006 || Kitt Peak || Spacewatch || — || align=right data-sort-value="0.84" | 840 m || 
|-id=847 bgcolor=#d6d6d6
| 340847 ||  || — || December 12, 2006 || Catalina || CSS || Tj (2.93) || align=right | 4.4 km || 
|-id=848 bgcolor=#fefefe
| 340848 ||  || — || December 13, 2006 || Kitt Peak || Spacewatch || — || align=right | 1.00 km || 
|-id=849 bgcolor=#fefefe
| 340849 ||  || — || December 13, 2006 || Kitt Peak || Spacewatch || — || align=right data-sort-value="0.71" | 710 m || 
|-id=850 bgcolor=#fefefe
| 340850 ||  || — || December 11, 2006 || Kitt Peak || Spacewatch || — || align=right | 1.0 km || 
|-id=851 bgcolor=#fefefe
| 340851 ||  || — || December 21, 2006 || Kitt Peak || Spacewatch || — || align=right data-sort-value="0.77" | 770 m || 
|-id=852 bgcolor=#fefefe
| 340852 ||  || — || December 21, 2006 || Kitt Peak || Spacewatch || — || align=right data-sort-value="0.96" | 960 m || 
|-id=853 bgcolor=#fefefe
| 340853 ||  || — || December 21, 2006 || Mount Lemmon || Mount Lemmon Survey || FLO || align=right data-sort-value="0.80" | 800 m || 
|-id=854 bgcolor=#fefefe
| 340854 ||  || — || December 24, 2006 || Kitt Peak || Spacewatch || — || align=right | 1.4 km || 
|-id=855 bgcolor=#fefefe
| 340855 ||  || — || January 11, 2007 || Pla D'Arguines || R. Ferrando || — || align=right data-sort-value="0.90" | 900 m || 
|-id=856 bgcolor=#fefefe
| 340856 ||  || — || January 10, 2007 || Mount Lemmon || Mount Lemmon Survey || — || align=right data-sort-value="0.79" | 790 m || 
|-id=857 bgcolor=#fefefe
| 340857 ||  || — || January 9, 2007 || Kitt Peak || Spacewatch || MAS || align=right data-sort-value="0.68" | 680 m || 
|-id=858 bgcolor=#fefefe
| 340858 ||  || — || January 17, 2007 || Palomar || NEAT || — || align=right data-sort-value="0.84" | 840 m || 
|-id=859 bgcolor=#fefefe
| 340859 ||  || — || January 17, 2007 || Kitt Peak || Spacewatch || — || align=right | 4.2 km || 
|-id=860 bgcolor=#fefefe
| 340860 ||  || — || January 17, 2007 || Palomar || NEAT || — || align=right data-sort-value="0.78" | 780 m || 
|-id=861 bgcolor=#fefefe
| 340861 ||  || — || January 17, 2007 || Palomar || NEAT || — || align=right data-sort-value="0.94" | 940 m || 
|-id=862 bgcolor=#fefefe
| 340862 ||  || — || January 24, 2007 || Mount Lemmon || Mount Lemmon Survey || — || align=right data-sort-value="0.78" | 780 m || 
|-id=863 bgcolor=#fefefe
| 340863 ||  || — || January 24, 2007 || Mount Lemmon || Mount Lemmon Survey || FLO || align=right data-sort-value="0.73" | 730 m || 
|-id=864 bgcolor=#fefefe
| 340864 ||  || — || January 24, 2007 || Mount Lemmon || Mount Lemmon Survey || — || align=right data-sort-value="0.71" | 710 m || 
|-id=865 bgcolor=#fefefe
| 340865 ||  || — || January 24, 2007 || Catalina || CSS || — || align=right data-sort-value="0.98" | 980 m || 
|-id=866 bgcolor=#fefefe
| 340866 ||  || — || January 24, 2007 || Catalina || CSS || — || align=right data-sort-value="0.86" | 860 m || 
|-id=867 bgcolor=#fefefe
| 340867 ||  || — || January 22, 2007 || Lulin Observatory || H.-C. Lin, Q.-z. Ye || — || align=right | 1.1 km || 
|-id=868 bgcolor=#fefefe
| 340868 ||  || — || January 27, 2007 || Mount Lemmon || Mount Lemmon Survey || — || align=right | 1.0 km || 
|-id=869 bgcolor=#fefefe
| 340869 ||  || — || January 27, 2007 || Mount Lemmon || Mount Lemmon Survey || FLO || align=right data-sort-value="0.83" | 830 m || 
|-id=870 bgcolor=#fefefe
| 340870 ||  || — || January 27, 2007 || Mount Lemmon || Mount Lemmon Survey || — || align=right data-sort-value="0.76" | 760 m || 
|-id=871 bgcolor=#fefefe
| 340871 ||  || — || January 25, 2007 || Kitt Peak || Spacewatch || — || align=right data-sort-value="0.59" | 590 m || 
|-id=872 bgcolor=#fefefe
| 340872 ||  || — || January 17, 2007 || Kitt Peak || Spacewatch || FLO || align=right data-sort-value="0.80" | 800 m || 
|-id=873 bgcolor=#fefefe
| 340873 ||  || — || January 9, 2007 || Kitt Peak || Spacewatch || NYS || align=right data-sort-value="0.86" | 860 m || 
|-id=874 bgcolor=#fefefe
| 340874 ||  || — || January 27, 2007 || Kitt Peak || Spacewatch || — || align=right | 1.2 km || 
|-id=875 bgcolor=#fefefe
| 340875 ||  || — || January 17, 2007 || Kitt Peak || Spacewatch || — || align=right | 1.0 km || 
|-id=876 bgcolor=#fefefe
| 340876 ||  || — || February 6, 2007 || Kitt Peak || Spacewatch || — || align=right data-sort-value="0.75" | 750 m || 
|-id=877 bgcolor=#fefefe
| 340877 ||  || — || February 6, 2007 || Mount Lemmon || Mount Lemmon Survey || — || align=right | 1.0 km || 
|-id=878 bgcolor=#fefefe
| 340878 ||  || — || February 6, 2007 || Mount Lemmon || Mount Lemmon Survey || FLO || align=right data-sort-value="0.84" | 840 m || 
|-id=879 bgcolor=#fefefe
| 340879 ||  || — || February 6, 2007 || Mount Lemmon || Mount Lemmon Survey || V || align=right data-sort-value="0.72" | 720 m || 
|-id=880 bgcolor=#fefefe
| 340880 ||  || — || February 8, 2007 || Kitt Peak || Spacewatch || — || align=right | 1.1 km || 
|-id=881 bgcolor=#fefefe
| 340881 ||  || — || February 9, 2007 || Kitt Peak || Spacewatch || — || align=right data-sort-value="0.94" | 940 m || 
|-id=882 bgcolor=#fefefe
| 340882 ||  || — || February 6, 2007 || Kitt Peak || Spacewatch || — || align=right | 1.0 km || 
|-id=883 bgcolor=#fefefe
| 340883 ||  || — || February 6, 2007 || Mount Lemmon || Mount Lemmon Survey || — || align=right | 1.5 km || 
|-id=884 bgcolor=#fefefe
| 340884 ||  || — || February 7, 2007 || Kitt Peak || Spacewatch || — || align=right data-sort-value="0.98" | 980 m || 
|-id=885 bgcolor=#E9E9E9
| 340885 ||  || — || February 7, 2007 || Mount Lemmon || Mount Lemmon Survey || — || align=right | 2.1 km || 
|-id=886 bgcolor=#d6d6d6
| 340886 ||  || — || February 8, 2007 || Palomar || NEAT || 3:2 || align=right | 5.0 km || 
|-id=887 bgcolor=#fefefe
| 340887 ||  || — || February 10, 2007 || Mount Lemmon || Mount Lemmon Survey || — || align=right data-sort-value="0.92" | 920 m || 
|-id=888 bgcolor=#fefefe
| 340888 ||  || — || February 13, 2007 || Socorro || LINEAR || — || align=right data-sort-value="0.98" | 980 m || 
|-id=889 bgcolor=#fefefe
| 340889 ||  || — || January 17, 2007 || Kitt Peak || Spacewatch || — || align=right | 1.1 km || 
|-id=890 bgcolor=#fefefe
| 340890 ||  || — || February 15, 2007 || Palomar || NEAT || FLO || align=right data-sort-value="0.84" | 840 m || 
|-id=891 bgcolor=#fefefe
| 340891 Londoncommorch ||  ||  || February 14, 2007 || Lulin Observatory || Q.-z. Ye, C.-S. Lin || — || align=right | 1.1 km || 
|-id=892 bgcolor=#fefefe
| 340892 ||  || — || February 9, 2007 || Catalina || CSS || FLO || align=right data-sort-value="0.84" | 840 m || 
|-id=893 bgcolor=#d6d6d6
| 340893 ||  || — || February 9, 2007 || Catalina || CSS || HIL3:2 || align=right | 6.1 km || 
|-id=894 bgcolor=#fefefe
| 340894 ||  || — || February 10, 2007 || Catalina || CSS || — || align=right | 1.2 km || 
|-id=895 bgcolor=#fefefe
| 340895 ||  || — || February 15, 2007 || Palomar || NEAT || KLI || align=right | 2.5 km || 
|-id=896 bgcolor=#fefefe
| 340896 ||  || — || February 15, 2007 || Palomar || NEAT || — || align=right | 1.1 km || 
|-id=897 bgcolor=#fefefe
| 340897 ||  || — || February 10, 2007 || Mount Lemmon || Mount Lemmon Survey || — || align=right data-sort-value="0.85" | 850 m || 
|-id=898 bgcolor=#fefefe
| 340898 ||  || — || February 16, 2007 || Mount Lemmon || Mount Lemmon Survey || — || align=right data-sort-value="0.84" | 840 m || 
|-id=899 bgcolor=#fefefe
| 340899 ||  || — || February 17, 2007 || Kitt Peak || Spacewatch || FLO || align=right data-sort-value="0.70" | 700 m || 
|-id=900 bgcolor=#fefefe
| 340900 ||  || — || February 17, 2007 || Kitt Peak || Spacewatch || FLO || align=right data-sort-value="0.77" | 770 m || 
|}

340901–341000 

|-bgcolor=#fefefe
| 340901 ||  || — || February 17, 2007 || Kitt Peak || Spacewatch || — || align=right | 1.00 km || 
|-id=902 bgcolor=#fefefe
| 340902 ||  || — || February 17, 2007 || Kitt Peak || Spacewatch || — || align=right data-sort-value="0.82" | 820 m || 
|-id=903 bgcolor=#fefefe
| 340903 ||  || — || February 17, 2007 || Kitt Peak || Spacewatch || — || align=right data-sort-value="0.87" | 870 m || 
|-id=904 bgcolor=#fefefe
| 340904 ||  || — || February 17, 2007 || Kitt Peak || Spacewatch || — || align=right data-sort-value="0.73" | 730 m || 
|-id=905 bgcolor=#fefefe
| 340905 ||  || — || February 17, 2007 || Kitt Peak || Spacewatch || FLO || align=right data-sort-value="0.65" | 650 m || 
|-id=906 bgcolor=#fefefe
| 340906 ||  || — || February 17, 2007 || Kitt Peak || Spacewatch || — || align=right data-sort-value="0.90" | 900 m || 
|-id=907 bgcolor=#fefefe
| 340907 ||  || — || February 17, 2007 || Kitt Peak || Spacewatch || FLO || align=right data-sort-value="0.98" | 980 m || 
|-id=908 bgcolor=#fefefe
| 340908 ||  || — || February 17, 2007 || Kitt Peak || Spacewatch || NYS || align=right data-sort-value="0.76" | 760 m || 
|-id=909 bgcolor=#fefefe
| 340909 ||  || — || February 17, 2007 || Kitt Peak || Spacewatch || V || align=right data-sort-value="0.64" | 640 m || 
|-id=910 bgcolor=#fefefe
| 340910 ||  || — || February 21, 2007 || Socorro || LINEAR || — || align=right data-sort-value="0.80" | 800 m || 
|-id=911 bgcolor=#fefefe
| 340911 ||  || — || February 17, 2007 || Mount Lemmon || Mount Lemmon Survey || V || align=right data-sort-value="0.78" | 780 m || 
|-id=912 bgcolor=#C2FFFF
| 340912 ||  || — || February 19, 2007 || Mount Lemmon || Mount Lemmon Survey || L5010 || align=right | 13 km || 
|-id=913 bgcolor=#fefefe
| 340913 ||  || — || February 21, 2007 || Kitt Peak || Spacewatch || — || align=right data-sort-value="0.89" | 890 m || 
|-id=914 bgcolor=#fefefe
| 340914 ||  || — || February 21, 2007 || Kitt Peak || Spacewatch || MAS || align=right data-sort-value="0.75" | 750 m || 
|-id=915 bgcolor=#fefefe
| 340915 ||  || — || February 21, 2007 || Mount Lemmon || Mount Lemmon Survey || NYS || align=right data-sort-value="0.69" | 690 m || 
|-id=916 bgcolor=#fefefe
| 340916 ||  || — || February 23, 2007 || Mount Lemmon || Mount Lemmon Survey || — || align=right data-sort-value="0.89" | 890 m || 
|-id=917 bgcolor=#fefefe
| 340917 ||  || — || November 24, 2006 || Kitt Peak || Spacewatch || FLO || align=right data-sort-value="0.67" | 670 m || 
|-id=918 bgcolor=#fefefe
| 340918 ||  || — || February 23, 2007 || Kitt Peak || Spacewatch || NYS || align=right data-sort-value="0.92" | 920 m || 
|-id=919 bgcolor=#fefefe
| 340919 ||  || — || February 17, 2007 || Mount Lemmon || Mount Lemmon Survey || — || align=right data-sort-value="0.90" | 900 m || 
|-id=920 bgcolor=#fefefe
| 340920 ||  || — || February 16, 2007 || Mount Lemmon || Mount Lemmon Survey || NYS || align=right data-sort-value="0.63" | 630 m || 
|-id=921 bgcolor=#fefefe
| 340921 ||  || — || February 23, 2007 || Mount Lemmon || Mount Lemmon Survey || NYS || align=right data-sort-value="0.86" | 860 m || 
|-id=922 bgcolor=#fefefe
| 340922 ||  || — || February 25, 2007 || Mount Lemmon || Mount Lemmon Survey || — || align=right | 1.4 km || 
|-id=923 bgcolor=#fefefe
| 340923 ||  || — || February 26, 2007 || Mount Lemmon || Mount Lemmon Survey || V || align=right data-sort-value="0.84" | 840 m || 
|-id=924 bgcolor=#E9E9E9
| 340924 ||  || — || February 25, 2007 || Mount Lemmon || Mount Lemmon Survey || EUN || align=right | 1.9 km || 
|-id=925 bgcolor=#C2FFFF
| 340925 ||  || — || February 23, 2007 || Kitt Peak || Spacewatch || L5 || align=right | 9.9 km || 
|-id=926 bgcolor=#fefefe
| 340926 ||  || — || November 16, 2006 || Mount Lemmon || Mount Lemmon Survey || V || align=right data-sort-value="0.93" | 930 m || 
|-id=927 bgcolor=#fefefe
| 340927 ||  || — || March 9, 2007 || Kitt Peak || Spacewatch || V || align=right data-sort-value="0.89" | 890 m || 
|-id=928 bgcolor=#fefefe
| 340928 ||  || — || January 28, 2003 || Kitt Peak || Spacewatch || — || align=right data-sort-value="0.75" | 750 m || 
|-id=929 bgcolor=#fefefe
| 340929 Bourgelat ||  ||  || March 9, 2007 || Saint-Sulpice || B. Christophe || — || align=right data-sort-value="0.66" | 660 m || 
|-id=930 bgcolor=#fefefe
| 340930 ||  || — || March 9, 2007 || Kitt Peak || Spacewatch || — || align=right | 1.6 km || 
|-id=931 bgcolor=#fefefe
| 340931 ||  || — || March 9, 2007 || Palomar || NEAT || — || align=right data-sort-value="0.96" | 960 m || 
|-id=932 bgcolor=#fefefe
| 340932 ||  || — || February 23, 2007 || Socorro || LINEAR || — || align=right | 1.2 km || 
|-id=933 bgcolor=#fefefe
| 340933 ||  || — || March 10, 2007 || Kitt Peak || Spacewatch || V || align=right data-sort-value="0.81" | 810 m || 
|-id=934 bgcolor=#fefefe
| 340934 ||  || — || March 10, 2007 || Kitt Peak || Spacewatch || CLA || align=right | 1.9 km || 
|-id=935 bgcolor=#fefefe
| 340935 ||  || — || March 10, 2007 || Mount Lemmon || Mount Lemmon Survey || — || align=right data-sort-value="0.90" | 900 m || 
|-id=936 bgcolor=#fefefe
| 340936 ||  || — || March 10, 2007 || Mount Lemmon || Mount Lemmon Survey || MAS || align=right data-sort-value="0.91" | 910 m || 
|-id=937 bgcolor=#fefefe
| 340937 ||  || — || March 10, 2007 || Palomar || NEAT || V || align=right data-sort-value="0.88" | 880 m || 
|-id=938 bgcolor=#E9E9E9
| 340938 ||  || — || March 11, 2007 || Mount Lemmon || Mount Lemmon Survey || JUN || align=right | 1.1 km || 
|-id=939 bgcolor=#fefefe
| 340939 ||  || — || March 12, 2007 || Marly || P. Kocher || — || align=right data-sort-value="0.99" | 990 m || 
|-id=940 bgcolor=#fefefe
| 340940 ||  || — || March 9, 2007 || Catalina || CSS || NYS || align=right | 1.6 km || 
|-id=941 bgcolor=#fefefe
| 340941 ||  || — || March 9, 2007 || Kitt Peak || Spacewatch || — || align=right | 1.1 km || 
|-id=942 bgcolor=#fefefe
| 340942 ||  || — || March 9, 2007 || Catalina || CSS || FLO || align=right data-sort-value="0.91" | 910 m || 
|-id=943 bgcolor=#C2FFFF
| 340943 ||  || — || March 9, 2007 || Kitt Peak || Spacewatch || L5 || align=right | 13 km || 
|-id=944 bgcolor=#fefefe
| 340944 ||  || — || March 9, 2007 || Kitt Peak || Spacewatch || — || align=right data-sort-value="0.93" | 930 m || 
|-id=945 bgcolor=#fefefe
| 340945 ||  || — || March 9, 2007 || Kitt Peak || Spacewatch || — || align=right data-sort-value="0.84" | 840 m || 
|-id=946 bgcolor=#E9E9E9
| 340946 ||  || — || March 12, 2007 || Kitt Peak || Spacewatch || RAF || align=right data-sort-value="0.81" | 810 m || 
|-id=947 bgcolor=#fefefe
| 340947 ||  || — || March 9, 2007 || Mount Lemmon || Mount Lemmon Survey || — || align=right | 1.5 km || 
|-id=948 bgcolor=#C2FFFF
| 340948 ||  || — || March 10, 2007 || Kitt Peak || Spacewatch || L5 || align=right | 13 km || 
|-id=949 bgcolor=#fefefe
| 340949 ||  || — || March 10, 2007 || Palomar || NEAT || — || align=right data-sort-value="0.89" | 890 m || 
|-id=950 bgcolor=#fefefe
| 340950 ||  || — || March 10, 2007 || Kitt Peak || Spacewatch || FLO || align=right data-sort-value="0.94" | 940 m || 
|-id=951 bgcolor=#C2FFFF
| 340951 ||  || — || March 10, 2007 || Kitt Peak || Spacewatch || L5 || align=right | 11 km || 
|-id=952 bgcolor=#fefefe
| 340952 ||  || — || March 10, 2007 || Kitt Peak || Spacewatch || — || align=right | 1.1 km || 
|-id=953 bgcolor=#C2FFFF
| 340953 ||  || — || March 10, 2007 || Mount Lemmon || Mount Lemmon Survey || L5010 || align=right | 7.2 km || 
|-id=954 bgcolor=#fefefe
| 340954 ||  || — || March 10, 2007 || Kitt Peak || Spacewatch || V || align=right data-sort-value="0.86" | 860 m || 
|-id=955 bgcolor=#fefefe
| 340955 ||  || — || March 11, 2007 || Catalina || CSS || NYS || align=right | 3.1 km || 
|-id=956 bgcolor=#fefefe
| 340956 ||  || — || March 12, 2007 || Kitt Peak || Spacewatch || — || align=right | 2.9 km || 
|-id=957 bgcolor=#fefefe
| 340957 ||  || — || February 27, 2007 || Kitt Peak || Spacewatch || FLO || align=right data-sort-value="0.75" | 750 m || 
|-id=958 bgcolor=#fefefe
| 340958 ||  || — || March 9, 2007 || Kitt Peak || Spacewatch || — || align=right | 1.1 km || 
|-id=959 bgcolor=#fefefe
| 340959 ||  || — || March 9, 2007 || Mount Lemmon || Mount Lemmon Survey || — || align=right data-sort-value="0.86" | 860 m || 
|-id=960 bgcolor=#fefefe
| 340960 ||  || — || February 23, 2007 || Kitt Peak || Spacewatch || — || align=right | 1.00 km || 
|-id=961 bgcolor=#d6d6d6
| 340961 ||  || — || March 10, 2007 || Mount Lemmon || Mount Lemmon Survey || SHU3:2 || align=right | 5.7 km || 
|-id=962 bgcolor=#fefefe
| 340962 ||  || — || March 11, 2007 || Kitt Peak || Spacewatch || V || align=right data-sort-value="0.96" | 960 m || 
|-id=963 bgcolor=#fefefe
| 340963 ||  || — || March 11, 2007 || Kitt Peak || Spacewatch || FLO || align=right data-sort-value="0.75" | 750 m || 
|-id=964 bgcolor=#fefefe
| 340964 ||  || — || March 11, 2007 || Kitt Peak || Spacewatch || — || align=right data-sort-value="0.96" | 960 m || 
|-id=965 bgcolor=#E9E9E9
| 340965 ||  || — || March 11, 2007 || Mount Lemmon || Mount Lemmon Survey || — || align=right data-sort-value="0.88" | 880 m || 
|-id=966 bgcolor=#C2FFFF
| 340966 ||  || — || March 11, 2007 || Kitt Peak || Spacewatch || L5 || align=right | 9.5 km || 
|-id=967 bgcolor=#E9E9E9
| 340967 ||  || — || March 11, 2007 || Kitt Peak || Spacewatch || — || align=right data-sort-value="0.97" | 970 m || 
|-id=968 bgcolor=#E9E9E9
| 340968 ||  || — || March 11, 2007 || Mount Lemmon || Mount Lemmon Survey || — || align=right | 1.2 km || 
|-id=969 bgcolor=#fefefe
| 340969 ||  || — || March 13, 2007 || Mount Lemmon || Mount Lemmon Survey || — || align=right data-sort-value="0.92" | 920 m || 
|-id=970 bgcolor=#E9E9E9
| 340970 ||  || — || March 13, 2007 || Mount Lemmon || Mount Lemmon Survey || — || align=right | 1.2 km || 
|-id=971 bgcolor=#fefefe
| 340971 ||  || — || March 13, 2007 || Mount Lemmon || Mount Lemmon Survey || — || align=right | 1.0 km || 
|-id=972 bgcolor=#fefefe
| 340972 ||  || — || March 9, 2007 || Mount Lemmon || Mount Lemmon Survey || — || align=right data-sort-value="0.84" | 840 m || 
|-id=973 bgcolor=#fefefe
| 340973 ||  || — || February 10, 2007 || Catalina || CSS || V || align=right data-sort-value="0.66" | 660 m || 
|-id=974 bgcolor=#fefefe
| 340974 ||  || — || March 11, 2007 || Anderson Mesa || LONEOS || — || align=right data-sort-value="0.96" | 960 m || 
|-id=975 bgcolor=#fefefe
| 340975 ||  || — || March 12, 2007 || Kitt Peak || Spacewatch || — || align=right data-sort-value="0.97" | 970 m || 
|-id=976 bgcolor=#fefefe
| 340976 ||  || — || March 12, 2007 || Mount Lemmon || Mount Lemmon Survey || V || align=right data-sort-value="0.68" | 680 m || 
|-id=977 bgcolor=#fefefe
| 340977 ||  || — || March 12, 2007 || Catalina || CSS || CHL || align=right | 2.9 km || 
|-id=978 bgcolor=#fefefe
| 340978 ||  || — || March 13, 2007 || Mount Lemmon || Mount Lemmon Survey || — || align=right data-sort-value="0.80" | 800 m || 
|-id=979 bgcolor=#fefefe
| 340979 ||  || — || March 13, 2007 || Kitt Peak || Spacewatch || NYS || align=right data-sort-value="0.66" | 660 m || 
|-id=980 bgcolor=#fefefe
| 340980 Bad Vilbel ||  ||  || March 15, 2007 || Bergen-Enkheim || U. Süßenberger || V || align=right data-sort-value="0.80" | 800 m || 
|-id=981 bgcolor=#fefefe
| 340981 ||  || — || March 14, 2007 || Kitt Peak || Spacewatch || NYS || align=right | 2.4 km || 
|-id=982 bgcolor=#fefefe
| 340982 ||  || — || March 14, 2007 || Kitt Peak || Spacewatch || V || align=right data-sort-value="0.57" | 570 m || 
|-id=983 bgcolor=#E9E9E9
| 340983 ||  || — || March 14, 2007 || Kitt Peak || Spacewatch || EUN || align=right | 1.5 km || 
|-id=984 bgcolor=#fefefe
| 340984 ||  || — || March 7, 2003 || Anderson Mesa || LONEOS || — || align=right data-sort-value="0.98" | 980 m || 
|-id=985 bgcolor=#fefefe
| 340985 ||  || — || March 12, 2007 || Mount Lemmon || Mount Lemmon Survey || — || align=right | 1.5 km || 
|-id=986 bgcolor=#fefefe
| 340986 ||  || — || March 14, 2007 || Mount Lemmon || Mount Lemmon Survey || FLO || align=right data-sort-value="0.80" | 800 m || 
|-id=987 bgcolor=#fefefe
| 340987 ||  || — || March 13, 2007 || Kitt Peak || Spacewatch || FLO || align=right data-sort-value="0.55" | 550 m || 
|-id=988 bgcolor=#fefefe
| 340988 ||  || — || March 14, 2007 || Kitt Peak || Spacewatch || — || align=right data-sort-value="0.98" | 980 m || 
|-id=989 bgcolor=#E9E9E9
| 340989 ||  || — || March 10, 2007 || Mount Lemmon || Mount Lemmon Survey || — || align=right data-sort-value="0.92" | 920 m || 
|-id=990 bgcolor=#fefefe
| 340990 ||  || — || March 15, 2007 || Kitt Peak || Spacewatch || — || align=right data-sort-value="0.85" | 850 m || 
|-id=991 bgcolor=#fefefe
| 340991 ||  || — || March 15, 2007 || Mount Lemmon || Mount Lemmon Survey || V || align=right data-sort-value="0.86" | 860 m || 
|-id=992 bgcolor=#C2FFFF
| 340992 ||  || — || March 15, 2007 || Mount Lemmon || Mount Lemmon Survey || L5 || align=right | 12 km || 
|-id=993 bgcolor=#fefefe
| 340993 ||  || — || March 13, 2007 || Catalina || CSS || PHO || align=right | 4.1 km || 
|-id=994 bgcolor=#fefefe
| 340994 ||  || — || March 8, 2007 || Palomar || NEAT || NYS || align=right data-sort-value="0.73" | 730 m || 
|-id=995 bgcolor=#fefefe
| 340995 ||  || — || March 8, 2007 || Palomar || NEAT || — || align=right | 1.00 km || 
|-id=996 bgcolor=#fefefe
| 340996 ||  || — || March 9, 2007 || Kitt Peak || Spacewatch || — || align=right data-sort-value="0.82" | 820 m || 
|-id=997 bgcolor=#fefefe
| 340997 ||  || — || March 12, 2007 || Catalina || CSS || — || align=right | 1.1 km || 
|-id=998 bgcolor=#fefefe
| 340998 ||  || — || March 12, 2007 || Catalina || CSS || — || align=right data-sort-value="0.92" | 920 m || 
|-id=999 bgcolor=#E9E9E9
| 340999 ||  || — || March 15, 2007 || Catalina || CSS || — || align=right | 1.5 km || 
|-id=000 bgcolor=#fefefe
| 341000 ||  || — || March 14, 2007 || Kitt Peak || Spacewatch || V || align=right data-sort-value="0.70" | 700 m || 
|}

References

External links 
 Discovery Circumstances: Numbered Minor Planets (340001)–(345000) (IAU Minor Planet Center)

0340